

311001–311100 

|-bgcolor=#fefefe
| 311001 ||  || — || November 21, 2003 || Socorro || LINEAR || — || align=right data-sort-value="0.84" | 840 m || 
|-id=002 bgcolor=#E9E9E9
| 311002 ||  || — || November 24, 2003 || Socorro || LINEAR || — || align=right | 1.9 km || 
|-id=003 bgcolor=#fefefe
| 311003 ||  || — || December 14, 2003 || Palomar || NEAT || — || align=right | 1.3 km || 
|-id=004 bgcolor=#fefefe
| 311004 ||  || — || December 17, 2003 || Socorro || LINEAR || PHO || align=right | 2.0 km || 
|-id=005 bgcolor=#fefefe
| 311005 ||  || — || December 17, 2003 || Socorro || LINEAR || H || align=right | 1.0 km || 
|-id=006 bgcolor=#E9E9E9
| 311006 ||  || — || December 17, 2003 || Palomar || NEAT || EUN || align=right | 2.0 km || 
|-id=007 bgcolor=#fefefe
| 311007 ||  || — || December 17, 2003 || Anderson Mesa || LONEOS || H || align=right | 1.2 km || 
|-id=008 bgcolor=#E9E9E9
| 311008 ||  || — || December 17, 2003 || Kitt Peak || Spacewatch || — || align=right | 1.7 km || 
|-id=009 bgcolor=#E9E9E9
| 311009 ||  || — || December 17, 2003 || Kitt Peak || Spacewatch || AER || align=right | 1.7 km || 
|-id=010 bgcolor=#d6d6d6
| 311010 ||  || — || December 19, 2003 || Kitt Peak || Spacewatch || 3:2 || align=right | 8.2 km || 
|-id=011 bgcolor=#E9E9E9
| 311011 ||  || — || December 19, 2003 || Socorro || LINEAR || — || align=right | 1.5 km || 
|-id=012 bgcolor=#E9E9E9
| 311012 ||  || — || December 18, 2003 || Socorro || LINEAR || — || align=right | 1.6 km || 
|-id=013 bgcolor=#E9E9E9
| 311013 ||  || — || December 18, 2003 || Socorro || LINEAR || — || align=right | 1.3 km || 
|-id=014 bgcolor=#fefefe
| 311014 ||  || — || December 29, 2003 || Socorro || LINEAR || H || align=right data-sort-value="0.70" | 700 m || 
|-id=015 bgcolor=#E9E9E9
| 311015 ||  || — || December 27, 2003 || Socorro || LINEAR || — || align=right | 1.5 km || 
|-id=016 bgcolor=#E9E9E9
| 311016 ||  || — || December 28, 2003 || Socorro || LINEAR || JUN || align=right | 1.3 km || 
|-id=017 bgcolor=#E9E9E9
| 311017 ||  || — || December 29, 2003 || Socorro || LINEAR || — || align=right | 1.6 km || 
|-id=018 bgcolor=#E9E9E9
| 311018 ||  || — || December 30, 2003 || Socorro || LINEAR || HNS || align=right | 1.9 km || 
|-id=019 bgcolor=#E9E9E9
| 311019 ||  || — || December 17, 2003 || Socorro || LINEAR || — || align=right | 1.4 km || 
|-id=020 bgcolor=#E9E9E9
| 311020 ||  || — || December 18, 2003 || Kitt Peak || Spacewatch || — || align=right | 1.2 km || 
|-id=021 bgcolor=#E9E9E9
| 311021 ||  || — || January 12, 2004 || Palomar || NEAT || EUN || align=right | 1.7 km || 
|-id=022 bgcolor=#fefefe
| 311022 ||  || — || January 14, 2004 || Palomar || NEAT || H || align=right data-sort-value="0.68" | 680 m || 
|-id=023 bgcolor=#E9E9E9
| 311023 ||  || — || January 17, 2004 || Haleakala || NEAT || — || align=right | 1.4 km || 
|-id=024 bgcolor=#E9E9E9
| 311024 ||  || — || January 18, 2004 || Palomar || NEAT || — || align=right | 1.3 km || 
|-id=025 bgcolor=#E9E9E9
| 311025 ||  || — || January 16, 2004 || Palomar || NEAT || — || align=right | 1.0 km || 
|-id=026 bgcolor=#E9E9E9
| 311026 ||  || — || January 16, 2004 || Kitt Peak || Spacewatch || — || align=right | 2.5 km || 
|-id=027 bgcolor=#E9E9E9
| 311027 ||  || — || January 19, 2004 || Catalina || CSS || — || align=right | 1.2 km || 
|-id=028 bgcolor=#E9E9E9
| 311028 ||  || — || January 18, 2004 || Palomar || NEAT || — || align=right | 1.1 km || 
|-id=029 bgcolor=#E9E9E9
| 311029 ||  || — || January 18, 2004 || Palomar || NEAT || RAF || align=right | 1.2 km || 
|-id=030 bgcolor=#E9E9E9
| 311030 ||  || — || January 19, 2004 || Kitt Peak || Spacewatch || — || align=right | 1.1 km || 
|-id=031 bgcolor=#E9E9E9
| 311031 ||  || — || January 19, 2004 || Kitt Peak || Spacewatch || — || align=right | 1.3 km || 
|-id=032 bgcolor=#E9E9E9
| 311032 ||  || — || January 19, 2004 || Catalina || CSS || — || align=right | 1.2 km || 
|-id=033 bgcolor=#E9E9E9
| 311033 ||  || — || January 22, 2004 || Socorro || LINEAR || — || align=right | 1.6 km || 
|-id=034 bgcolor=#E9E9E9
| 311034 ||  || — || January 21, 2004 || Socorro || LINEAR || — || align=right | 1.2 km || 
|-id=035 bgcolor=#E9E9E9
| 311035 ||  || — || December 18, 2003 || Kitt Peak || Spacewatch || — || align=right | 1.4 km || 
|-id=036 bgcolor=#E9E9E9
| 311036 ||  || — || January 21, 2004 || Socorro || LINEAR || MAR || align=right | 1.4 km || 
|-id=037 bgcolor=#E9E9E9
| 311037 ||  || — || January 22, 2004 || Socorro || LINEAR || — || align=right | 1.2 km || 
|-id=038 bgcolor=#fefefe
| 311038 ||  || — || January 23, 2004 || Anderson Mesa || LONEOS || H || align=right data-sort-value="0.88" | 880 m || 
|-id=039 bgcolor=#E9E9E9
| 311039 ||  || — || January 24, 2004 || Socorro || LINEAR || — || align=right data-sort-value="0.98" | 980 m || 
|-id=040 bgcolor=#fefefe
| 311040 ||  || — || January 23, 2004 || Socorro || LINEAR || H || align=right data-sort-value="0.69" | 690 m || 
|-id=041 bgcolor=#E9E9E9
| 311041 ||  || — || January 22, 2004 || Socorro || LINEAR || — || align=right | 1.3 km || 
|-id=042 bgcolor=#E9E9E9
| 311042 ||  || — || January 26, 2004 || Anderson Mesa || LONEOS || — || align=right | 1.3 km || 
|-id=043 bgcolor=#E9E9E9
| 311043 ||  || — || January 28, 2004 || Catalina || CSS || — || align=right | 2.0 km || 
|-id=044 bgcolor=#FFC2E0
| 311044 ||  || — || January 31, 2004 || Socorro || LINEAR || APO +1kmPHA || align=right | 1.3 km || 
|-id=045 bgcolor=#E9E9E9
| 311045 ||  || — || January 28, 2004 || Catalina || CSS || — || align=right | 1.5 km || 
|-id=046 bgcolor=#fefefe
| 311046 ||  || — || January 29, 2004 || Socorro || LINEAR || H || align=right data-sort-value="0.74" | 740 m || 
|-id=047 bgcolor=#E9E9E9
| 311047 ||  || — || January 16, 2004 || Kitt Peak || Spacewatch || — || align=right data-sort-value="0.68" | 680 m || 
|-id=048 bgcolor=#E9E9E9
| 311048 ||  || — || January 19, 2004 || Kitt Peak || Spacewatch || — || align=right data-sort-value="0.78" | 780 m || 
|-id=049 bgcolor=#E9E9E9
| 311049 ||  || — || January 19, 2004 || Kitt Peak || Spacewatch || — || align=right data-sort-value="0.94" | 940 m || 
|-id=050 bgcolor=#E9E9E9
| 311050 ||  || — || January 19, 2004 || Kitt Peak || Spacewatch || — || align=right | 1.2 km || 
|-id=051 bgcolor=#E9E9E9
| 311051 ||  || — || January 22, 2004 || Socorro || LINEAR || — || align=right | 1.2 km || 
|-id=052 bgcolor=#E9E9E9
| 311052 ||  || — || January 16, 2004 || Kitt Peak || Spacewatch || — || align=right | 1.0 km || 
|-id=053 bgcolor=#E9E9E9
| 311053 ||  || — || January 28, 2004 || Kitt Peak || Spacewatch || MAR || align=right data-sort-value="0.92" | 920 m || 
|-id=054 bgcolor=#E9E9E9
| 311054 ||  || — || February 10, 2004 || Palomar || NEAT || — || align=right | 1.2 km || 
|-id=055 bgcolor=#E9E9E9
| 311055 ||  || — || February 11, 2004 || Palomar || NEAT || — || align=right | 1.2 km || 
|-id=056 bgcolor=#E9E9E9
| 311056 ||  || — || February 11, 2004 || Kitt Peak || Spacewatch || — || align=right data-sort-value="0.97" | 970 m || 
|-id=057 bgcolor=#E9E9E9
| 311057 ||  || — || February 11, 2004 || Palomar || NEAT || — || align=right | 1.1 km || 
|-id=058 bgcolor=#E9E9E9
| 311058 ||  || — || February 11, 2004 || Socorro || LINEAR || — || align=right | 1.5 km || 
|-id=059 bgcolor=#E9E9E9
| 311059 ||  || — || February 10, 2004 || Palomar || NEAT || — || align=right | 1.2 km || 
|-id=060 bgcolor=#E9E9E9
| 311060 ||  || — || February 11, 2004 || Palomar || NEAT || — || align=right | 1.3 km || 
|-id=061 bgcolor=#E9E9E9
| 311061 ||  || — || February 14, 2004 || Haleakala || NEAT || — || align=right | 1.9 km || 
|-id=062 bgcolor=#E9E9E9
| 311062 ||  || — || February 15, 2004 || Socorro || LINEAR || — || align=right data-sort-value="0.94" | 940 m || 
|-id=063 bgcolor=#E9E9E9
| 311063 ||  || — || February 10, 2004 || Palomar || NEAT || — || align=right | 1.2 km || 
|-id=064 bgcolor=#E9E9E9
| 311064 ||  || — || February 11, 2004 || Palomar || NEAT || — || align=right | 1.4 km || 
|-id=065 bgcolor=#E9E9E9
| 311065 ||  || — || February 12, 2004 || Palomar || NEAT || — || align=right | 1.6 km || 
|-id=066 bgcolor=#FFC2E0
| 311066 ||  || — || February 16, 2004 || Socorro || LINEAR || APO +1kmPHAmoon || align=right data-sort-value="0.83" | 830 m || 
|-id=067 bgcolor=#E9E9E9
| 311067 ||  || — || February 16, 2004 || Kitt Peak || Spacewatch || — || align=right | 1.3 km || 
|-id=068 bgcolor=#E9E9E9
| 311068 ||  || — || February 16, 2004 || Kitt Peak || Spacewatch || — || align=right | 3.6 km || 
|-id=069 bgcolor=#E9E9E9
| 311069 ||  || — || February 17, 2004 || Kitt Peak || Spacewatch || — || align=right data-sort-value="0.94" | 940 m || 
|-id=070 bgcolor=#E9E9E9
| 311070 ||  || — || February 17, 2004 || Socorro || LINEAR || — || align=right | 1.1 km || 
|-id=071 bgcolor=#E9E9E9
| 311071 ||  || — || February 17, 2004 || Socorro || LINEAR || — || align=right | 1.9 km || 
|-id=072 bgcolor=#d6d6d6
| 311072 ||  || — || February 26, 2004 || Socorro || LINEAR || SHU3:2 || align=right | 9.4 km || 
|-id=073 bgcolor=#E9E9E9
| 311073 ||  || — || February 18, 2004 || Socorro || LINEAR || — || align=right | 1.9 km || 
|-id=074 bgcolor=#E9E9E9
| 311074 ||  || — || March 10, 2004 || Palomar || NEAT || — || align=right | 4.7 km || 
|-id=075 bgcolor=#E9E9E9
| 311075 ||  || — || March 11, 2004 || Palomar || NEAT || — || align=right | 1.7 km || 
|-id=076 bgcolor=#E9E9E9
| 311076 ||  || — || March 15, 2004 || Desert Eagle || W. K. Y. Yeung || — || align=right | 1.5 km || 
|-id=077 bgcolor=#E9E9E9
| 311077 ||  || — || March 12, 2004 || Palomar || NEAT || JUN || align=right | 1.6 km || 
|-id=078 bgcolor=#E9E9E9
| 311078 ||  || — || March 15, 2004 || Kitt Peak || Spacewatch || — || align=right | 1.5 km || 
|-id=079 bgcolor=#E9E9E9
| 311079 ||  || — || March 15, 2004 || Kitt Peak || Spacewatch || — || align=right | 2.3 km || 
|-id=080 bgcolor=#E9E9E9
| 311080 ||  || — || March 15, 2004 || Catalina || CSS || — || align=right | 1.4 km || 
|-id=081 bgcolor=#E9E9E9
| 311081 ||  || — || March 15, 2004 || Socorro || LINEAR || — || align=right | 1.4 km || 
|-id=082 bgcolor=#E9E9E9
| 311082 ||  || — || March 15, 2004 || Catalina || CSS || — || align=right | 1.8 km || 
|-id=083 bgcolor=#E9E9E9
| 311083 ||  || — || March 13, 2004 || Palomar || NEAT || MIS || align=right | 3.4 km || 
|-id=084 bgcolor=#E9E9E9
| 311084 ||  || — || March 14, 2004 || Kitt Peak || Spacewatch || WIT || align=right | 1.2 km || 
|-id=085 bgcolor=#E9E9E9
| 311085 ||  || — || March 15, 2004 || Socorro || LINEAR || — || align=right | 1.4 km || 
|-id=086 bgcolor=#E9E9E9
| 311086 ||  || — || March 15, 2004 || Socorro || LINEAR || JUN || align=right | 1.2 km || 
|-id=087 bgcolor=#E9E9E9
| 311087 ||  || — || March 15, 2004 || Socorro || LINEAR || — || align=right | 2.1 km || 
|-id=088 bgcolor=#E9E9E9
| 311088 ||  || — || March 15, 2004 || Kitt Peak || Spacewatch || — || align=right | 1.9 km || 
|-id=089 bgcolor=#E9E9E9
| 311089 ||  || — || March 16, 2004 || Catalina || CSS || ADE || align=right | 2.7 km || 
|-id=090 bgcolor=#E9E9E9
| 311090 ||  || — || March 16, 2004 || Kitt Peak || Spacewatch || — || align=right | 2.2 km || 
|-id=091 bgcolor=#E9E9E9
| 311091 ||  || — || March 17, 2004 || Kitt Peak || Spacewatch || GEF || align=right | 1.6 km || 
|-id=092 bgcolor=#E9E9E9
| 311092 ||  || — || March 17, 2004 || Kitt Peak || Spacewatch || BRG || align=right | 1.7 km || 
|-id=093 bgcolor=#E9E9E9
| 311093 ||  || — || March 22, 2004 || Socorro || LINEAR || — || align=right | 2.5 km || 
|-id=094 bgcolor=#E9E9E9
| 311094 ||  || — || March 27, 2004 || Socorro || LINEAR || — || align=right | 1.4 km || 
|-id=095 bgcolor=#E9E9E9
| 311095 ||  || — || March 27, 2004 || Kitt Peak || Spacewatch || CLO || align=right | 2.9 km || 
|-id=096 bgcolor=#E9E9E9
| 311096 ||  || — || March 17, 2004 || Socorro || LINEAR || JUN || align=right | 1.5 km || 
|-id=097 bgcolor=#E9E9E9
| 311097 ||  || — || March 28, 2004 || Socorro || LINEAR || — || align=right | 1.9 km || 
|-id=098 bgcolor=#E9E9E9
| 311098 ||  || — || March 30, 2004 || Kitt Peak || Spacewatch || ADE || align=right | 1.8 km || 
|-id=099 bgcolor=#E9E9E9
| 311099 ||  || — || April 11, 2004 || Palomar || NEAT || CLO || align=right | 3.2 km || 
|-id=100 bgcolor=#E9E9E9
| 311100 ||  || — || April 13, 2004 || Palomar || NEAT || — || align=right | 2.1 km || 
|}

311101–311200 

|-bgcolor=#E9E9E9
| 311101 ||  || — || April 15, 2004 || Socorro || LINEAR || — || align=right | 3.5 km || 
|-id=102 bgcolor=#E9E9E9
| 311102 ||  || — || April 16, 2004 || Anderson Mesa || LONEOS || — || align=right | 1.6 km || 
|-id=103 bgcolor=#E9E9E9
| 311103 ||  || — || April 16, 2004 || Kitt Peak || Spacewatch || — || align=right | 1.9 km || 
|-id=104 bgcolor=#E9E9E9
| 311104 ||  || — || April 16, 2004 || Kitt Peak || Spacewatch || 526 || align=right | 3.2 km || 
|-id=105 bgcolor=#E9E9E9
| 311105 ||  || — || April 19, 2004 || Socorro || LINEAR || — || align=right | 3.2 km || 
|-id=106 bgcolor=#E9E9E9
| 311106 ||  || — || April 20, 2004 || Kitt Peak || Spacewatch || EUN || align=right | 1.8 km || 
|-id=107 bgcolor=#E9E9E9
| 311107 ||  || — || April 24, 2004 || Socorro || LINEAR || — || align=right | 2.3 km || 
|-id=108 bgcolor=#E9E9E9
| 311108 ||  || — || May 9, 2004 || Socorro || LINEAR || BAR || align=right | 1.9 km || 
|-id=109 bgcolor=#E9E9E9
| 311109 ||  || — || May 9, 2004 || Kitt Peak || Spacewatch || — || align=right | 2.3 km || 
|-id=110 bgcolor=#d6d6d6
| 311110 ||  || — || May 13, 2004 || Palomar || NEAT || EUP || align=right | 4.5 km || 
|-id=111 bgcolor=#E9E9E9
| 311111 ||  || — || May 21, 2004 || Catalina || CSS || GEF || align=right | 2.0 km || 
|-id=112 bgcolor=#d6d6d6
| 311112 ||  || — || June 12, 2004 || Catalina || CSS || BRA || align=right | 2.1 km || 
|-id=113 bgcolor=#d6d6d6
| 311113 ||  || — || June 11, 2004 || Socorro || LINEAR || — || align=right | 5.0 km || 
|-id=114 bgcolor=#d6d6d6
| 311114 ||  || — || June 15, 2004 || Socorro || LINEAR || — || align=right | 4.4 km || 
|-id=115 bgcolor=#d6d6d6
| 311115 ||  || — || July 14, 2004 || Socorro || LINEAR || — || align=right | 2.4 km || 
|-id=116 bgcolor=#FA8072
| 311116 ||  || — || July 14, 2004 || Socorro || LINEAR || — || align=right data-sort-value="0.87" | 870 m || 
|-id=117 bgcolor=#d6d6d6
| 311117 ||  || — || July 11, 2004 || Socorro || LINEAR || TIR || align=right | 2.0 km || 
|-id=118 bgcolor=#d6d6d6
| 311118 || 2004 OQ || — || July 17, 2004 || 7300 Observatory || W. K. Y. Yeung || — || align=right | 3.4 km || 
|-id=119 bgcolor=#d6d6d6
| 311119 Pacner ||  ||  || August 8, 2004 || Kleť || KLENOT || HYG || align=right | 2.9 km || 
|-id=120 bgcolor=#d6d6d6
| 311120 ||  || — || August 9, 2004 || Socorro || LINEAR || — || align=right | 4.0 km || 
|-id=121 bgcolor=#fefefe
| 311121 ||  || — || August 8, 2004 || Palomar || NEAT || — || align=right data-sort-value="0.78" | 780 m || 
|-id=122 bgcolor=#d6d6d6
| 311122 ||  || — || August 12, 2004 || Palomar || NEAT || — || align=right | 4.5 km || 
|-id=123 bgcolor=#E9E9E9
| 311123 ||  || — || August 11, 2004 || Campo Imperatore || CINEOS || — || align=right | 3.3 km || 
|-id=124 bgcolor=#fefefe
| 311124 ||  || — || August 8, 2004 || Socorro || LINEAR || — || align=right | 1.3 km || 
|-id=125 bgcolor=#d6d6d6
| 311125 ||  || — || August 13, 2004 || Palomar || NEAT || — || align=right | 4.7 km || 
|-id=126 bgcolor=#fefefe
| 311126 ||  || — || August 27, 2004 || Socorro || LINEAR || PHO || align=right | 1.4 km || 
|-id=127 bgcolor=#fefefe
| 311127 ||  || — || August 26, 2004 || Socorro || LINEAR || PHO || align=right | 4.1 km || 
|-id=128 bgcolor=#d6d6d6
| 311128 ||  || — || August 22, 2004 || Kitt Peak || Spacewatch || — || align=right | 3.9 km || 
|-id=129 bgcolor=#d6d6d6
| 311129 ||  || — || September 5, 2004 || Palomar || NEAT || EOS || align=right | 2.7 km || 
|-id=130 bgcolor=#d6d6d6
| 311130 ||  || — || September 6, 2004 || Siding Spring || SSS || EOS || align=right | 2.6 km || 
|-id=131 bgcolor=#fefefe
| 311131 ||  || — || September 8, 2004 || Socorro || LINEAR || — || align=right data-sort-value="0.85" | 850 m || 
|-id=132 bgcolor=#fefefe
| 311132 ||  || — || September 8, 2004 || Socorro || LINEAR || — || align=right data-sort-value="0.95" | 950 m || 
|-id=133 bgcolor=#d6d6d6
| 311133 ||  || — || September 7, 2004 || Palomar || NEAT || — || align=right | 4.4 km || 
|-id=134 bgcolor=#d6d6d6
| 311134 ||  || — || September 7, 2004 || Palomar || NEAT || EOS || align=right | 2.4 km || 
|-id=135 bgcolor=#fefefe
| 311135 ||  || — || September 9, 2004 || Kitt Peak || Spacewatch || — || align=right data-sort-value="0.89" | 890 m || 
|-id=136 bgcolor=#fefefe
| 311136 ||  || — || September 8, 2004 || Campo Imperatore || CINEOS || FLO || align=right data-sort-value="0.54" | 540 m || 
|-id=137 bgcolor=#d6d6d6
| 311137 ||  || — || August 20, 2004 || Catalina || CSS || URS || align=right | 3.6 km || 
|-id=138 bgcolor=#d6d6d6
| 311138 ||  || — || September 9, 2004 || Socorro || LINEAR || — || align=right | 5.1 km || 
|-id=139 bgcolor=#d6d6d6
| 311139 ||  || — || September 10, 2004 || Socorro || LINEAR || EOS || align=right | 2.7 km || 
|-id=140 bgcolor=#d6d6d6
| 311140 ||  || — || September 10, 2004 || Socorro || LINEAR || — || align=right | 5.5 km || 
|-id=141 bgcolor=#fefefe
| 311141 ||  || — || September 10, 2004 || Socorro || LINEAR || — || align=right | 1.1 km || 
|-id=142 bgcolor=#d6d6d6
| 311142 ||  || — || September 10, 2004 || Socorro || LINEAR || CRO || align=right | 4.6 km || 
|-id=143 bgcolor=#FA8072
| 311143 ||  || — || September 9, 2004 || Socorro || LINEAR || — || align=right | 1.1 km || 
|-id=144 bgcolor=#fefefe
| 311144 ||  || — || September 9, 2004 || Kitt Peak || Spacewatch || — || align=right data-sort-value="0.79" | 790 m || 
|-id=145 bgcolor=#fefefe
| 311145 ||  || — || September 10, 2004 || Socorro || LINEAR || FLO || align=right | 1.9 km || 
|-id=146 bgcolor=#d6d6d6
| 311146 ||  || — || September 12, 2004 || Socorro || LINEAR || — || align=right | 5.1 km || 
|-id=147 bgcolor=#d6d6d6
| 311147 ||  || — || September 12, 2004 || Socorro || LINEAR || ALA || align=right | 4.8 km || 
|-id=148 bgcolor=#d6d6d6
| 311148 ||  || — || September 13, 2004 || Kitt Peak || Spacewatch || — || align=right | 4.8 km || 
|-id=149 bgcolor=#d6d6d6
| 311149 ||  || — || September 11, 2004 || Socorro || LINEAR || — || align=right | 4.6 km || 
|-id=150 bgcolor=#d6d6d6
| 311150 ||  || — || September 11, 2004 || Reedy Creek || J. Broughton || — || align=right | 4.1 km || 
|-id=151 bgcolor=#FA8072
| 311151 ||  || — || September 21, 2004 || Socorro || LINEAR || — || align=right | 1.7 km || 
|-id=152 bgcolor=#fefefe
| 311152 ||  || — || September 17, 2004 || Socorro || LINEAR || — || align=right | 1.3 km || 
|-id=153 bgcolor=#d6d6d6
| 311153 ||  || — || September 17, 2004 || Kitt Peak || Spacewatch || — || align=right | 3.7 km || 
|-id=154 bgcolor=#FA8072
| 311154 ||  || — || October 4, 2004 || Socorro || LINEAR || — || align=right data-sort-value="0.94" | 940 m || 
|-id=155 bgcolor=#d6d6d6
| 311155 ||  || — || October 12, 2004 || Socorro || LINEAR || EUP || align=right | 6.8 km || 
|-id=156 bgcolor=#fefefe
| 311156 ||  || — || October 4, 2004 || Kitt Peak || Spacewatch || — || align=right | 1.1 km || 
|-id=157 bgcolor=#fefefe
| 311157 ||  || — || October 4, 2004 || Kitt Peak || Spacewatch || NYS || align=right data-sort-value="0.65" | 650 m || 
|-id=158 bgcolor=#fefefe
| 311158 ||  || — || October 4, 2004 || Kitt Peak || Spacewatch || — || align=right data-sort-value="0.74" | 740 m || 
|-id=159 bgcolor=#fefefe
| 311159 ||  || — || October 5, 2004 || Kitt Peak || Spacewatch || FLO || align=right data-sort-value="0.80" | 800 m || 
|-id=160 bgcolor=#d6d6d6
| 311160 ||  || — || October 4, 2004 || Socorro || LINEAR || ALA || align=right | 6.4 km || 
|-id=161 bgcolor=#d6d6d6
| 311161 ||  || — || October 5, 2004 || Kitt Peak || Spacewatch || — || align=right | 4.0 km || 
|-id=162 bgcolor=#fefefe
| 311162 ||  || — || October 7, 2004 || Palomar || NEAT || FLO || align=right data-sort-value="0.69" | 690 m || 
|-id=163 bgcolor=#d6d6d6
| 311163 ||  || — || October 9, 2004 || Anderson Mesa || LONEOS || VER || align=right | 4.2 km || 
|-id=164 bgcolor=#fefefe
| 311164 ||  || — || October 4, 2004 || Kitt Peak || Spacewatch || FLO || align=right data-sort-value="0.77" | 770 m || 
|-id=165 bgcolor=#fefefe
| 311165 ||  || — || October 6, 2004 || Kitt Peak || Spacewatch || — || align=right data-sort-value="0.59" | 590 m || 
|-id=166 bgcolor=#fefefe
| 311166 ||  || — || October 7, 2004 || Kitt Peak || Spacewatch || — || align=right data-sort-value="0.67" | 670 m || 
|-id=167 bgcolor=#fefefe
| 311167 ||  || — || October 5, 2004 || Kitt Peak || Spacewatch || — || align=right data-sort-value="0.86" | 860 m || 
|-id=168 bgcolor=#fefefe
| 311168 ||  || — || October 7, 2004 || Socorro || LINEAR || — || align=right | 1.1 km || 
|-id=169 bgcolor=#fefefe
| 311169 ||  || — || October 9, 2004 || Socorro || LINEAR || — || align=right data-sort-value="0.78" | 780 m || 
|-id=170 bgcolor=#fefefe
| 311170 ||  || — || October 7, 2004 || Socorro || LINEAR || — || align=right | 1.1 km || 
|-id=171 bgcolor=#fefefe
| 311171 ||  || — || October 7, 2004 || Kitt Peak || Spacewatch || — || align=right data-sort-value="0.64" | 640 m || 
|-id=172 bgcolor=#fefefe
| 311172 ||  || — || October 9, 2004 || Socorro || LINEAR || — || align=right | 1.2 km || 
|-id=173 bgcolor=#d6d6d6
| 311173 ||  || — || October 10, 2004 || Kitt Peak || Spacewatch || 7:4 || align=right | 4.0 km || 
|-id=174 bgcolor=#d6d6d6
| 311174 ||  || — || October 10, 2004 || Socorro || LINEAR || EOS || align=right | 3.2 km || 
|-id=175 bgcolor=#fefefe
| 311175 ||  || — || October 13, 2004 || Anderson Mesa || LONEOS || — || align=right | 1.2 km || 
|-id=176 bgcolor=#fefefe
| 311176 ||  || — || October 15, 2004 || Anderson Mesa || LONEOS || — || align=right data-sort-value="0.87" | 870 m || 
|-id=177 bgcolor=#fefefe
| 311177 ||  || — || October 11, 2004 || Moletai || K. Černis, J. Zdanavičius || FLO || align=right data-sort-value="0.73" | 730 m || 
|-id=178 bgcolor=#fefefe
| 311178 ||  || — || March 31, 2003 || Kitt Peak || Spacewatch || V || align=right data-sort-value="0.87" | 870 m || 
|-id=179 bgcolor=#fefefe
| 311179 ||  || — || November 3, 2004 || Kitt Peak || Spacewatch || FLO || align=right data-sort-value="0.73" | 730 m || 
|-id=180 bgcolor=#fefefe
| 311180 ||  || — || November 4, 2004 || Kitt Peak || Spacewatch || — || align=right data-sort-value="0.88" | 880 m || 
|-id=181 bgcolor=#d6d6d6
| 311181 ||  || — || November 9, 2004 || Catalina || CSS || HYG || align=right | 4.1 km || 
|-id=182 bgcolor=#fefefe
| 311182 ||  || — || November 7, 2004 || Socorro || LINEAR || FLO || align=right data-sort-value="0.77" | 770 m || 
|-id=183 bgcolor=#fefefe
| 311183 ||  || — || November 4, 2004 || Catalina || CSS || FLO || align=right data-sort-value="0.84" | 840 m || 
|-id=184 bgcolor=#fefefe
| 311184 ||  || — || November 17, 2004 || Siding Spring || SSS || FLO || align=right data-sort-value="0.71" | 710 m || 
|-id=185 bgcolor=#fefefe
| 311185 ||  || — || December 2, 2004 || Catalina || CSS || — || align=right data-sort-value="0.99" | 990 m || 
|-id=186 bgcolor=#fefefe
| 311186 ||  || — || December 2, 2004 || Catalina || CSS || FLO || align=right data-sort-value="0.84" | 840 m || 
|-id=187 bgcolor=#fefefe
| 311187 ||  || — || December 8, 2004 || Socorro || LINEAR || NYS || align=right data-sort-value="0.82" | 820 m || 
|-id=188 bgcolor=#fefefe
| 311188 ||  || — || December 3, 2004 || Kitt Peak || Spacewatch || FLO || align=right data-sort-value="0.88" | 880 m || 
|-id=189 bgcolor=#fefefe
| 311189 ||  || — || December 3, 2004 || Kitt Peak || Spacewatch || — || align=right data-sort-value="0.98" | 980 m || 
|-id=190 bgcolor=#fefefe
| 311190 ||  || — || December 8, 2004 || Socorro || LINEAR || FLO || align=right data-sort-value="0.87" | 870 m || 
|-id=191 bgcolor=#fefefe
| 311191 ||  || — || December 10, 2004 || Nashville || R. Clingan || FLO || align=right data-sort-value="0.87" | 870 m || 
|-id=192 bgcolor=#fefefe
| 311192 ||  || — || December 11, 2004 || Socorro || LINEAR || V || align=right data-sort-value="0.87" | 870 m || 
|-id=193 bgcolor=#fefefe
| 311193 ||  || — || December 12, 2004 || Kitt Peak || Spacewatch || NYS || align=right data-sort-value="0.80" | 800 m || 
|-id=194 bgcolor=#fefefe
| 311194 ||  || — || December 9, 2004 || Jarnac || Jarnac Obs. || — || align=right | 1.2 km || 
|-id=195 bgcolor=#fefefe
| 311195 ||  || — || December 14, 2004 || Junk Bond || Junk Bond Obs. || — || align=right data-sort-value="0.90" | 900 m || 
|-id=196 bgcolor=#fefefe
| 311196 ||  || — || December 10, 2004 || Kitt Peak || Spacewatch || — || align=right | 1.1 km || 
|-id=197 bgcolor=#fefefe
| 311197 ||  || — || December 10, 2004 || Socorro || LINEAR || — || align=right | 1.4 km || 
|-id=198 bgcolor=#fefefe
| 311198 ||  || — || December 10, 2004 || Socorro || LINEAR || FLO || align=right data-sort-value="0.90" | 900 m || 
|-id=199 bgcolor=#fefefe
| 311199 ||  || — || December 11, 2004 || Kitt Peak || Spacewatch || — || align=right data-sort-value="0.96" | 960 m || 
|-id=200 bgcolor=#fefefe
| 311200 ||  || — || December 11, 2004 || Kitt Peak || Spacewatch || — || align=right | 1.1 km || 
|}

311201–311300 

|-bgcolor=#fefefe
| 311201 ||  || — || December 11, 2004 || Socorro || LINEAR || — || align=right | 2.5 km || 
|-id=202 bgcolor=#fefefe
| 311202 ||  || — || December 12, 2004 || Kitt Peak || Spacewatch || — || align=right data-sort-value="0.89" | 890 m || 
|-id=203 bgcolor=#fefefe
| 311203 ||  || — || December 14, 2004 || Socorro || LINEAR || — || align=right | 1.1 km || 
|-id=204 bgcolor=#fefefe
| 311204 ||  || — || December 12, 2004 || Kitt Peak || Spacewatch || FLO || align=right data-sort-value="0.79" | 790 m || 
|-id=205 bgcolor=#fefefe
| 311205 ||  || — || December 15, 2004 || Socorro || LINEAR || V || align=right data-sort-value="0.90" | 900 m || 
|-id=206 bgcolor=#fefefe
| 311206 ||  || — || December 13, 2004 || Campo Imperatore || CINEOS || NYS || align=right data-sort-value="0.66" | 660 m || 
|-id=207 bgcolor=#fefefe
| 311207 ||  || — || December 15, 2004 || Socorro || LINEAR || — || align=right | 1.3 km || 
|-id=208 bgcolor=#fefefe
| 311208 ||  || — || December 15, 2004 || Kitt Peak || Spacewatch || FLO || align=right data-sort-value="0.60" | 600 m || 
|-id=209 bgcolor=#fefefe
| 311209 ||  || — || December 15, 2004 || Kitt Peak || Spacewatch || — || align=right data-sort-value="0.82" | 820 m || 
|-id=210 bgcolor=#fefefe
| 311210 ||  || — || December 2, 2004 || Socorro || LINEAR || — || align=right | 1.3 km || 
|-id=211 bgcolor=#fefefe
| 311211 ||  || — || December 18, 2004 || Mount Lemmon || Mount Lemmon Survey || — || align=right data-sort-value="0.84" | 840 m || 
|-id=212 bgcolor=#fefefe
| 311212 ||  || — || December 18, 2004 || Mount Lemmon || Mount Lemmon Survey || V || align=right data-sort-value="0.76" | 760 m || 
|-id=213 bgcolor=#fefefe
| 311213 ||  || — || December 19, 2004 || Kitt Peak || Spacewatch || — || align=right data-sort-value="0.91" | 910 m || 
|-id=214 bgcolor=#fefefe
| 311214 ||  || — || January 6, 2005 || Catalina || CSS || — || align=right | 1.0 km || 
|-id=215 bgcolor=#fefefe
| 311215 ||  || — || January 7, 2005 || Kitt Peak || Spacewatch || NYS || align=right data-sort-value="0.84" | 840 m || 
|-id=216 bgcolor=#fefefe
| 311216 ||  || — || January 6, 2005 || Socorro || LINEAR || — || align=right | 1.0 km || 
|-id=217 bgcolor=#fefefe
| 311217 ||  || — || January 6, 2005 || Catalina || CSS || — || align=right data-sort-value="0.82" | 820 m || 
|-id=218 bgcolor=#fefefe
| 311218 ||  || — || January 7, 2005 || Socorro || LINEAR || — || align=right | 1.3 km || 
|-id=219 bgcolor=#fefefe
| 311219 ||  || — || January 7, 2005 || Socorro || LINEAR || — || align=right | 1.2 km || 
|-id=220 bgcolor=#fefefe
| 311220 ||  || — || January 11, 2005 || Socorro || LINEAR || — || align=right data-sort-value="0.78" | 780 m || 
|-id=221 bgcolor=#FA8072
| 311221 ||  || — || January 15, 2005 || Socorro || LINEAR || — || align=right | 1.2 km || 
|-id=222 bgcolor=#fefefe
| 311222 ||  || — || January 11, 2005 || Socorro || LINEAR || NYS || align=right data-sort-value="0.69" | 690 m || 
|-id=223 bgcolor=#fefefe
| 311223 ||  || — || January 15, 2005 || Socorro || LINEAR || NYS || align=right data-sort-value="0.79" | 790 m || 
|-id=224 bgcolor=#fefefe
| 311224 ||  || — || January 15, 2005 || Kitt Peak || Spacewatch || MAS || align=right data-sort-value="0.67" | 670 m || 
|-id=225 bgcolor=#fefefe
| 311225 ||  || — || January 15, 2005 || Kitt Peak || Spacewatch || — || align=right | 1.1 km || 
|-id=226 bgcolor=#fefefe
| 311226 ||  || — || January 15, 2005 || Kitt Peak || Spacewatch || — || align=right data-sort-value="0.97" | 970 m || 
|-id=227 bgcolor=#fefefe
| 311227 ||  || — || January 15, 2005 || Kitt Peak || Spacewatch || — || align=right data-sort-value="0.76" | 760 m || 
|-id=228 bgcolor=#fefefe
| 311228 ||  || — || January 16, 2005 || Socorro || LINEAR || PHO || align=right | 1.4 km || 
|-id=229 bgcolor=#fefefe
| 311229 ||  || — || January 16, 2005 || Socorro || LINEAR || ERI || align=right | 1.4 km || 
|-id=230 bgcolor=#fefefe
| 311230 ||  || — || January 16, 2005 || Socorro || LINEAR || — || align=right data-sort-value="0.94" | 940 m || 
|-id=231 bgcolor=#fefefe
| 311231 Anuradhapura ||  ||  || January 16, 2005 || Kitt Peak || Spacewatch || — || align=right | 1.0 km || 
|-id=232 bgcolor=#fefefe
| 311232 ||  || — || January 18, 2005 || Catalina || CSS || — || align=right data-sort-value="0.96" | 960 m || 
|-id=233 bgcolor=#fefefe
| 311233 ||  || — || February 1, 2005 || Kitt Peak || Spacewatch || — || align=right | 1.3 km || 
|-id=234 bgcolor=#fefefe
| 311234 ||  || — || February 2, 2005 || Socorro || LINEAR || V || align=right | 1.2 km || 
|-id=235 bgcolor=#fefefe
| 311235 ||  || — || February 2, 2005 || Socorro || LINEAR || — || align=right data-sort-value="0.80" | 800 m || 
|-id=236 bgcolor=#fefefe
| 311236 ||  || — || February 2, 2005 || Catalina || CSS || NYS || align=right data-sort-value="0.77" | 770 m || 
|-id=237 bgcolor=#fefefe
| 311237 ||  || — || February 1, 2005 || Palomar || NEAT || — || align=right | 1.1 km || 
|-id=238 bgcolor=#fefefe
| 311238 ||  || — || February 1, 2005 || Palomar || NEAT || NYS || align=right data-sort-value="0.95" | 950 m || 
|-id=239 bgcolor=#fefefe
| 311239 ||  || — || February 3, 2005 || Socorro || LINEAR || — || align=right | 1.1 km || 
|-id=240 bgcolor=#fefefe
| 311240 ||  || — || February 1, 2005 || Kitt Peak || Spacewatch || NYS || align=right data-sort-value="0.93" | 930 m || 
|-id=241 bgcolor=#fefefe
| 311241 ||  || — || February 2, 2005 || Socorro || LINEAR || — || align=right data-sort-value="0.87" | 870 m || 
|-id=242 bgcolor=#fefefe
| 311242 ||  || — || February 9, 2005 || Anderson Mesa || LONEOS || — || align=right data-sort-value="0.91" | 910 m || 
|-id=243 bgcolor=#fefefe
| 311243 ||  || — || February 3, 2005 || Socorro || LINEAR || NYS || align=right data-sort-value="0.55" | 550 m || 
|-id=244 bgcolor=#fefefe
| 311244 ||  || — || March 3, 2005 || Vail-Jarnac || Jarnac Obs. || ERI || align=right | 1.8 km || 
|-id=245 bgcolor=#fefefe
| 311245 ||  || — || March 2, 2005 || Kitt Peak || Spacewatch || NYS || align=right data-sort-value="0.64" | 640 m || 
|-id=246 bgcolor=#fefefe
| 311246 ||  || — || March 3, 2005 || Kitt Peak || Spacewatch || NYS || align=right data-sort-value="0.76" | 760 m || 
|-id=247 bgcolor=#fefefe
| 311247 ||  || — || March 3, 2005 || Kitt Peak || Spacewatch || — || align=right data-sort-value="0.75" | 750 m || 
|-id=248 bgcolor=#fefefe
| 311248 ||  || — || March 3, 2005 || Kitt Peak || Spacewatch || NYS || align=right data-sort-value="0.74" | 740 m || 
|-id=249 bgcolor=#fefefe
| 311249 ||  || — || March 3, 2005 || Catalina || CSS || — || align=right | 1.0 km || 
|-id=250 bgcolor=#fefefe
| 311250 ||  || — || March 3, 2005 || Catalina || CSS || — || align=right | 1.2 km || 
|-id=251 bgcolor=#fefefe
| 311251 ||  || — || March 3, 2005 || Catalina || CSS || NYS || align=right | 1.00 km || 
|-id=252 bgcolor=#fefefe
| 311252 ||  || — || March 3, 2005 || Catalina || CSS || V || align=right data-sort-value="0.87" | 870 m || 
|-id=253 bgcolor=#fefefe
| 311253 ||  || — || March 3, 2005 || Catalina || CSS || — || align=right | 1.1 km || 
|-id=254 bgcolor=#fefefe
| 311254 ||  || — || March 8, 2005 || Mayhill || A. Lowe || — || align=right | 1.1 km || 
|-id=255 bgcolor=#fefefe
| 311255 ||  || — || March 3, 2005 || Kitt Peak || Spacewatch || — || align=right | 1.0 km || 
|-id=256 bgcolor=#fefefe
| 311256 ||  || — || March 3, 2005 || Catalina || CSS || — || align=right data-sort-value="0.94" | 940 m || 
|-id=257 bgcolor=#fefefe
| 311257 ||  || — || March 4, 2005 || Mount Lemmon || Mount Lemmon Survey || NYS || align=right data-sort-value="0.81" | 810 m || 
|-id=258 bgcolor=#fefefe
| 311258 ||  || — || March 7, 2005 || Socorro || LINEAR || — || align=right | 1.2 km || 
|-id=259 bgcolor=#fefefe
| 311259 ||  || — || March 3, 2005 || Kitt Peak || Spacewatch || NYS || align=right data-sort-value="0.61" | 610 m || 
|-id=260 bgcolor=#E9E9E9
| 311260 ||  || — || March 3, 2005 || Kitt Peak || Spacewatch || — || align=right | 2.2 km || 
|-id=261 bgcolor=#d6d6d6
| 311261 ||  || — || March 3, 2005 || Catalina || CSS || 3:2 || align=right | 6.9 km || 
|-id=262 bgcolor=#fefefe
| 311262 ||  || — || March 8, 2005 || Kitt Peak || Spacewatch || — || align=right data-sort-value="0.91" | 910 m || 
|-id=263 bgcolor=#fefefe
| 311263 ||  || — || March 3, 2005 || Catalina || CSS || NYS || align=right data-sort-value="0.63" | 630 m || 
|-id=264 bgcolor=#fefefe
| 311264 ||  || — || March 4, 2005 || Socorro || LINEAR || — || align=right | 1.1 km || 
|-id=265 bgcolor=#fefefe
| 311265 ||  || — || March 9, 2005 || Mount Lemmon || Mount Lemmon Survey || NYS || align=right data-sort-value="0.71" | 710 m || 
|-id=266 bgcolor=#fefefe
| 311266 ||  || — || March 9, 2005 || Catalina || CSS || V || align=right | 1.1 km || 
|-id=267 bgcolor=#fefefe
| 311267 ||  || — || March 10, 2005 || Catalina || CSS || — || align=right | 1.0 km || 
|-id=268 bgcolor=#fefefe
| 311268 ||  || — || March 10, 2005 || Mount Lemmon || Mount Lemmon Survey || — || align=right data-sort-value="0.95" | 950 m || 
|-id=269 bgcolor=#fefefe
| 311269 ||  || — || March 11, 2005 || Mount Lemmon || Mount Lemmon Survey || NYS || align=right data-sort-value="0.61" | 610 m || 
|-id=270 bgcolor=#fefefe
| 311270 ||  || — || March 11, 2005 || Mount Lemmon || Mount Lemmon Survey || — || align=right data-sort-value="0.91" | 910 m || 
|-id=271 bgcolor=#fefefe
| 311271 ||  || — || March 11, 2005 || Mount Lemmon || Mount Lemmon Survey || NYS || align=right data-sort-value="0.66" | 660 m || 
|-id=272 bgcolor=#fefefe
| 311272 ||  || — || March 11, 2005 || Mount Lemmon || Mount Lemmon Survey || NYS || align=right data-sort-value="0.88" | 880 m || 
|-id=273 bgcolor=#fefefe
| 311273 ||  || — || March 9, 2005 || Mount Lemmon || Mount Lemmon Survey || FLO || align=right data-sort-value="0.73" | 730 m || 
|-id=274 bgcolor=#fefefe
| 311274 ||  || — || March 10, 2005 || Mount Lemmon || Mount Lemmon Survey || NYS || align=right data-sort-value="0.71" | 710 m || 
|-id=275 bgcolor=#fefefe
| 311275 ||  || — || March 12, 2005 || Kitt Peak || Spacewatch || NYS || align=right data-sort-value="0.78" | 780 m || 
|-id=276 bgcolor=#fefefe
| 311276 ||  || — || March 10, 2005 || Catalina || CSS || — || align=right | 1.4 km || 
|-id=277 bgcolor=#fefefe
| 311277 ||  || — || March 11, 2005 || Mount Lemmon || Mount Lemmon Survey || NYS || align=right data-sort-value="0.58" | 580 m || 
|-id=278 bgcolor=#fefefe
| 311278 ||  || — || March 11, 2005 || Mount Lemmon || Mount Lemmon Survey || NYS || align=right data-sort-value="0.91" | 910 m || 
|-id=279 bgcolor=#fefefe
| 311279 ||  || — || March 11, 2005 || Mount Lemmon || Mount Lemmon Survey || NYS || align=right data-sort-value="0.74" | 740 m || 
|-id=280 bgcolor=#fefefe
| 311280 ||  || — || March 12, 2005 || Socorro || LINEAR || — || align=right | 1.00 km || 
|-id=281 bgcolor=#fefefe
| 311281 ||  || — || March 4, 2005 || Mount Lemmon || Mount Lemmon Survey || MAS || align=right data-sort-value="0.73" | 730 m || 
|-id=282 bgcolor=#fefefe
| 311282 ||  || — || March 11, 2005 || Kitt Peak || Spacewatch || — || align=right data-sort-value="0.91" | 910 m || 
|-id=283 bgcolor=#fefefe
| 311283 ||  || — || March 4, 2005 || Socorro || LINEAR || — || align=right | 1.0 km || 
|-id=284 bgcolor=#fefefe
| 311284 ||  || — || March 11, 2005 || Kitt Peak || Spacewatch || — || align=right data-sort-value="0.94" | 940 m || 
|-id=285 bgcolor=#fefefe
| 311285 ||  || — || March 16, 2005 || Catalina || CSS || — || align=right | 1.1 km || 
|-id=286 bgcolor=#fefefe
| 311286 ||  || — || April 1, 2005 || Kitt Peak || Spacewatch || MAS || align=right data-sort-value="0.89" | 890 m || 
|-id=287 bgcolor=#fefefe
| 311287 ||  || — || April 1, 2005 || Anderson Mesa || LONEOS || — || align=right | 1.2 km || 
|-id=288 bgcolor=#fefefe
| 311288 ||  || — || April 4, 2005 || Mount Lemmon || Mount Lemmon Survey || NYS || align=right data-sort-value="0.80" | 800 m || 
|-id=289 bgcolor=#fefefe
| 311289 ||  || — || April 5, 2005 || Mount Lemmon || Mount Lemmon Survey || — || align=right data-sort-value="0.77" | 770 m || 
|-id=290 bgcolor=#fefefe
| 311290 ||  || — || April 1, 2005 || Kitt Peak || Spacewatch || — || align=right | 1.3 km || 
|-id=291 bgcolor=#E9E9E9
| 311291 ||  || — || April 10, 2005 || Kitt Peak || Spacewatch || — || align=right | 2.4 km || 
|-id=292 bgcolor=#E9E9E9
| 311292 ||  || — || April 10, 2005 || Kitt Peak || Spacewatch || — || align=right | 2.2 km || 
|-id=293 bgcolor=#fefefe
| 311293 ||  || — || April 12, 2005 || Kitt Peak || Spacewatch || NYS || align=right data-sort-value="0.87" | 870 m || 
|-id=294 bgcolor=#fefefe
| 311294 ||  || — || April 12, 2005 || Kitt Peak || Spacewatch || EUT || align=right data-sort-value="0.81" | 810 m || 
|-id=295 bgcolor=#E9E9E9
| 311295 ||  || — || April 14, 2005 || Kitt Peak || Spacewatch || — || align=right | 1.0 km || 
|-id=296 bgcolor=#fefefe
| 311296 ||  || — || April 2, 2005 || Anderson Mesa || LONEOS || — || align=right | 1.0 km || 
|-id=297 bgcolor=#E9E9E9
| 311297 ||  || — || April 30, 2005 || Kitt Peak || Spacewatch || — || align=right | 1.2 km || 
|-id=298 bgcolor=#E9E9E9
| 311298 ||  || — || April 17, 2005 || Kitt Peak || Spacewatch || — || align=right | 3.0 km || 
|-id=299 bgcolor=#E9E9E9
| 311299 ||  || — || May 4, 2005 || Palomar || NEAT || ADE || align=right | 3.2 km || 
|-id=300 bgcolor=#E9E9E9
| 311300 ||  || — || May 4, 2005 || Kitt Peak || Spacewatch || — || align=right | 2.1 km || 
|}

311301–311400 

|-bgcolor=#fefefe
| 311301 ||  || — || May 4, 2005 || Kitt Peak || Spacewatch || — || align=right data-sort-value="0.95" | 950 m || 
|-id=302 bgcolor=#E9E9E9
| 311302 ||  || — || May 4, 2005 || Socorro || LINEAR || JUN || align=right | 1.5 km || 
|-id=303 bgcolor=#fefefe
| 311303 ||  || — || May 3, 2005 || Kitt Peak || Spacewatch || NYS || align=right data-sort-value="0.71" | 710 m || 
|-id=304 bgcolor=#fefefe
| 311304 ||  || — || May 4, 2005 || Kitt Peak || Spacewatch || MAS || align=right data-sort-value="0.97" | 970 m || 
|-id=305 bgcolor=#E9E9E9
| 311305 ||  || — || May 9, 2005 || Mount Lemmon || Mount Lemmon Survey || — || align=right | 1.2 km || 
|-id=306 bgcolor=#fefefe
| 311306 ||  || — || May 8, 2005 || Kitt Peak || Spacewatch || — || align=right | 1.0 km || 
|-id=307 bgcolor=#E9E9E9
| 311307 ||  || — || May 10, 2005 || Kitt Peak || Spacewatch || — || align=right | 2.1 km || 
|-id=308 bgcolor=#fefefe
| 311308 ||  || — || May 8, 2005 || Kitt Peak || Spacewatch || NYS || align=right data-sort-value="0.86" | 860 m || 
|-id=309 bgcolor=#E9E9E9
| 311309 ||  || — || May 17, 2005 || Mount Lemmon || Mount Lemmon Survey || — || align=right | 1.8 km || 
|-id=310 bgcolor=#fefefe
| 311310 ||  || — || May 16, 2005 || Siding Spring || SSS || PHO || align=right | 1.7 km || 
|-id=311 bgcolor=#E9E9E9
| 311311 ||  || — || June 1, 2005 || Mount Lemmon || Mount Lemmon Survey || TIN || align=right | 1.1 km || 
|-id=312 bgcolor=#E9E9E9
| 311312 ||  || — || June 2, 2005 || Catalina || CSS || — || align=right | 1.5 km || 
|-id=313 bgcolor=#E9E9E9
| 311313 ||  || — || June 10, 2005 || Kitt Peak || Spacewatch || — || align=right | 2.5 km || 
|-id=314 bgcolor=#E9E9E9
| 311314 ||  || — || June 17, 2005 || Mount Lemmon || Mount Lemmon Survey || — || align=right | 2.5 km || 
|-id=315 bgcolor=#E9E9E9
| 311315 ||  || — || June 27, 2005 || Kitt Peak || Spacewatch || — || align=right | 2.1 km || 
|-id=316 bgcolor=#d6d6d6
| 311316 ||  || — || June 27, 2005 || Kitt Peak || Spacewatch || — || align=right | 3.2 km || 
|-id=317 bgcolor=#E9E9E9
| 311317 ||  || — || June 29, 2005 || Kitt Peak || Spacewatch || — || align=right | 1.9 km || 
|-id=318 bgcolor=#E9E9E9
| 311318 ||  || — || June 29, 2005 || Kitt Peak || Spacewatch || — || align=right | 2.4 km || 
|-id=319 bgcolor=#E9E9E9
| 311319 ||  || — || June 30, 2005 || Kitt Peak || Spacewatch || — || align=right | 2.7 km || 
|-id=320 bgcolor=#E9E9E9
| 311320 ||  || — || June 29, 2005 || Kitt Peak || Spacewatch || — || align=right | 2.9 km || 
|-id=321 bgcolor=#FFC2E0
| 311321 ||  || — || July 3, 2005 || Siding Spring || SSS || AMO || align=right data-sort-value="0.58" | 580 m || 
|-id=322 bgcolor=#E9E9E9
| 311322 ||  || — || July 4, 2005 || Kitt Peak || Spacewatch || EUN || align=right | 1.5 km || 
|-id=323 bgcolor=#E9E9E9
| 311323 ||  || — || July 3, 2005 || Mount Lemmon || Mount Lemmon Survey || — || align=right | 1.6 km || 
|-id=324 bgcolor=#E9E9E9
| 311324 ||  || — || July 2, 2005 || Catalina || CSS || — || align=right | 2.2 km || 
|-id=325 bgcolor=#E9E9E9
| 311325 ||  || — || July 4, 2005 || Kitt Peak || Spacewatch || — || align=right | 2.7 km || 
|-id=326 bgcolor=#fefefe
| 311326 ||  || — || July 5, 2005 || Palomar || NEAT || H || align=right data-sort-value="0.83" | 830 m || 
|-id=327 bgcolor=#E9E9E9
| 311327 ||  || — || July 4, 2005 || Kitt Peak || Spacewatch || MRX || align=right | 1.4 km || 
|-id=328 bgcolor=#E9E9E9
| 311328 ||  || — || July 7, 2005 || Kitt Peak || Spacewatch || BRG || align=right | 1.9 km || 
|-id=329 bgcolor=#E9E9E9
| 311329 ||  || — || July 4, 2005 || Kitt Peak || Spacewatch || — || align=right | 2.1 km || 
|-id=330 bgcolor=#d6d6d6
| 311330 ||  || — || July 4, 2005 || Mount Lemmon || Mount Lemmon Survey || — || align=right | 2.0 km || 
|-id=331 bgcolor=#fefefe
| 311331 ||  || — || July 6, 2005 || Anderson Mesa || LONEOS || H || align=right data-sort-value="0.78" | 780 m || 
|-id=332 bgcolor=#d6d6d6
| 311332 ||  || — || July 16, 2005 || Reedy Creek || J. Broughton || — || align=right | 3.3 km || 
|-id=333 bgcolor=#E9E9E9
| 311333 ||  || — || July 27, 2005 || Palomar || NEAT || — || align=right | 3.4 km || 
|-id=334 bgcolor=#d6d6d6
| 311334 ||  || — || July 28, 2005 || Palomar || NEAT || BRA || align=right | 1.8 km || 
|-id=335 bgcolor=#d6d6d6
| 311335 ||  || — || July 31, 2005 || Palomar || NEAT || — || align=right | 3.5 km || 
|-id=336 bgcolor=#d6d6d6
| 311336 ||  || — || August 27, 2005 || Kitt Peak || Spacewatch || — || align=right | 2.9 km || 
|-id=337 bgcolor=#E9E9E9
| 311337 ||  || — || August 26, 2005 || Palomar || NEAT || — || align=right | 2.7 km || 
|-id=338 bgcolor=#d6d6d6
| 311338 ||  || — || August 26, 2005 || Palomar || NEAT || — || align=right | 3.5 km || 
|-id=339 bgcolor=#d6d6d6
| 311339 ||  || — || August 28, 2005 || Kitt Peak || Spacewatch || — || align=right | 4.3 km || 
|-id=340 bgcolor=#d6d6d6
| 311340 ||  || — || August 25, 2005 || Palomar || NEAT || — || align=right | 2.4 km || 
|-id=341 bgcolor=#d6d6d6
| 311341 ||  || — || August 26, 2005 || Palomar || NEAT || — || align=right | 3.5 km || 
|-id=342 bgcolor=#d6d6d6
| 311342 ||  || — || August 25, 2005 || Palomar || NEAT || HYG || align=right | 3.4 km || 
|-id=343 bgcolor=#d6d6d6
| 311343 ||  || — || August 26, 2005 || Palomar || NEAT || — || align=right | 2.4 km || 
|-id=344 bgcolor=#d6d6d6
| 311344 ||  || — || August 28, 2005 || Kitt Peak || Spacewatch || — || align=right | 3.0 km || 
|-id=345 bgcolor=#E9E9E9
| 311345 ||  || — || August 28, 2005 || Kitt Peak || Spacewatch || — || align=right | 2.3 km || 
|-id=346 bgcolor=#d6d6d6
| 311346 ||  || — || August 30, 2005 || Kitt Peak || Spacewatch || KOR || align=right | 1.5 km || 
|-id=347 bgcolor=#d6d6d6
| 311347 ||  || — || August 30, 2005 || Palomar || NEAT || — || align=right | 3.6 km || 
|-id=348 bgcolor=#d6d6d6
| 311348 ||  || — || August 26, 2005 || Palomar || NEAT || — || align=right | 3.1 km || 
|-id=349 bgcolor=#d6d6d6
| 311349 ||  || — || August 29, 2005 || Kitt Peak || Spacewatch || — || align=right | 2.5 km || 
|-id=350 bgcolor=#d6d6d6
| 311350 ||  || — || August 26, 2005 || Palomar || NEAT || — || align=right | 3.4 km || 
|-id=351 bgcolor=#d6d6d6
| 311351 ||  || — || August 31, 2005 || Palomar || NEAT || — || align=right | 3.5 km || 
|-id=352 bgcolor=#fefefe
| 311352 ||  || — || September 6, 2005 || Anderson Mesa || LONEOS || H || align=right data-sort-value="0.71" | 710 m || 
|-id=353 bgcolor=#d6d6d6
| 311353 ||  || — || September 10, 2005 || Anderson Mesa || LONEOS || — || align=right | 2.9 km || 
|-id=354 bgcolor=#d6d6d6
| 311354 ||  || — || September 10, 2005 || Anderson Mesa || LONEOS || — || align=right | 5.1 km || 
|-id=355 bgcolor=#d6d6d6
| 311355 ||  || — || September 13, 2005 || Sonoita || W. R. Cooney Jr., J. Gross || — || align=right | 3.1 km || 
|-id=356 bgcolor=#d6d6d6
| 311356 ||  || — || September 13, 2005 || Kitt Peak || Spacewatch || HYG || align=right | 2.6 km || 
|-id=357 bgcolor=#d6d6d6
| 311357 ||  || — || September 2, 2005 || Palomar || NEAT || — || align=right | 5.5 km || 
|-id=358 bgcolor=#fefefe
| 311358 ||  || — || September 22, 2005 || Palomar || NEAT || H || align=right | 1.00 km || 
|-id=359 bgcolor=#d6d6d6
| 311359 ||  || — || September 24, 2005 || Kitt Peak || Spacewatch || — || align=right | 2.7 km || 
|-id=360 bgcolor=#d6d6d6
| 311360 ||  || — || September 23, 2005 || Kitt Peak || Spacewatch || — || align=right | 3.8 km || 
|-id=361 bgcolor=#d6d6d6
| 311361 ||  || — || September 24, 2005 || Kitt Peak || Spacewatch || — || align=right | 3.8 km || 
|-id=362 bgcolor=#d6d6d6
| 311362 ||  || — || September 24, 2005 || Kitt Peak || Spacewatch || — || align=right | 3.8 km || 
|-id=363 bgcolor=#d6d6d6
| 311363 ||  || — || September 23, 2005 || Siding Spring || SSS || — || align=right | 3.0 km || 
|-id=364 bgcolor=#d6d6d6
| 311364 ||  || — || September 24, 2005 || Kitt Peak || Spacewatch || — || align=right | 3.7 km || 
|-id=365 bgcolor=#d6d6d6
| 311365 ||  || — || September 25, 2005 || Kitt Peak || Spacewatch || — || align=right | 2.6 km || 
|-id=366 bgcolor=#d6d6d6
| 311366 ||  || — || September 25, 2005 || Kitt Peak || Spacewatch || — || align=right | 4.6 km || 
|-id=367 bgcolor=#d6d6d6
| 311367 ||  || — || September 26, 2005 || Kitt Peak || Spacewatch || — || align=right | 3.8 km || 
|-id=368 bgcolor=#d6d6d6
| 311368 ||  || — || September 25, 2005 || Kitt Peak || Spacewatch || THM || align=right | 2.7 km || 
|-id=369 bgcolor=#d6d6d6
| 311369 ||  || — || September 25, 2005 || Kitt Peak || Spacewatch || — || align=right | 2.5 km || 
|-id=370 bgcolor=#d6d6d6
| 311370 ||  || — || September 25, 2005 || Kitt Peak || Spacewatch || HYG || align=right | 2.7 km || 
|-id=371 bgcolor=#d6d6d6
| 311371 ||  || — || September 26, 2005 || Kitt Peak || Spacewatch || — || align=right | 3.8 km || 
|-id=372 bgcolor=#d6d6d6
| 311372 ||  || — || September 29, 2005 || Kitt Peak || Spacewatch || — || align=right | 3.6 km || 
|-id=373 bgcolor=#d6d6d6
| 311373 ||  || — || September 29, 2005 || Kitt Peak || Spacewatch || HYG || align=right | 3.1 km || 
|-id=374 bgcolor=#d6d6d6
| 311374 ||  || — || September 30, 2005 || Kitt Peak || Spacewatch || — || align=right | 2.7 km || 
|-id=375 bgcolor=#d6d6d6
| 311375 ||  || — || September 30, 2005 || Anderson Mesa || LONEOS || — || align=right | 3.3 km || 
|-id=376 bgcolor=#d6d6d6
| 311376 ||  || — || September 30, 2005 || Palomar || NEAT || — || align=right | 4.1 km || 
|-id=377 bgcolor=#d6d6d6
| 311377 ||  || — || September 29, 2005 || Kitt Peak || Spacewatch || — || align=right | 4.0 km || 
|-id=378 bgcolor=#d6d6d6
| 311378 ||  || — || September 28, 2005 || Palomar || NEAT || — || align=right | 2.6 km || 
|-id=379 bgcolor=#d6d6d6
| 311379 ||  || — || September 30, 2005 || Mount Lemmon || Mount Lemmon Survey || — || align=right | 2.9 km || 
|-id=380 bgcolor=#d6d6d6
| 311380 ||  || — || September 30, 2005 || Palomar || NEAT || — || align=right | 3.1 km || 
|-id=381 bgcolor=#E9E9E9
| 311381 ||  || — || September 24, 2005 || Palomar || NEAT || EUN || align=right | 2.2 km || 
|-id=382 bgcolor=#d6d6d6
| 311382 ||  || — || September 29, 2005 || Anderson Mesa || LONEOS || — || align=right | 2.5 km || 
|-id=383 bgcolor=#d6d6d6
| 311383 ||  || — || September 23, 2005 || Kitt Peak || Spacewatch || EOS || align=right | 2.1 km || 
|-id=384 bgcolor=#d6d6d6
| 311384 ||  || — || September 25, 2005 || Apache Point || A. C. Becker || — || align=right | 4.7 km || 
|-id=385 bgcolor=#d6d6d6
| 311385 ||  || — || September 24, 2005 || Kitt Peak || Spacewatch || — || align=right | 2.5 km || 
|-id=386 bgcolor=#d6d6d6
| 311386 ||  || — || September 25, 2005 || Kitt Peak || Spacewatch || — || align=right | 2.6 km || 
|-id=387 bgcolor=#d6d6d6
| 311387 ||  || — || October 1, 2005 || Kitt Peak || Spacewatch || — || align=right | 2.6 km || 
|-id=388 bgcolor=#d6d6d6
| 311388 ||  || — || October 3, 2005 || Palomar || NEAT || — || align=right | 4.8 km || 
|-id=389 bgcolor=#d6d6d6
| 311389 ||  || — || October 1, 2005 || Mount Lemmon || Mount Lemmon Survey || THM || align=right | 2.5 km || 
|-id=390 bgcolor=#d6d6d6
| 311390 ||  || — || October 4, 2005 || Palomar || NEAT || — || align=right | 3.3 km || 
|-id=391 bgcolor=#d6d6d6
| 311391 ||  || — || October 1, 2005 || Kitt Peak || Spacewatch || THM || align=right | 2.4 km || 
|-id=392 bgcolor=#d6d6d6
| 311392 ||  || — || October 3, 2005 || Socorro || LINEAR || — || align=right | 5.2 km || 
|-id=393 bgcolor=#d6d6d6
| 311393 ||  || — || October 3, 2005 || Catalina || CSS || — || align=right | 3.7 km || 
|-id=394 bgcolor=#d6d6d6
| 311394 ||  || — || October 1, 2005 || Mount Lemmon || Mount Lemmon Survey || HYG || align=right | 2.6 km || 
|-id=395 bgcolor=#d6d6d6
| 311395 ||  || — || October 5, 2005 || Catalina || CSS || — || align=right | 3.7 km || 
|-id=396 bgcolor=#d6d6d6
| 311396 ||  || — || October 4, 2005 || Mount Lemmon || Mount Lemmon Survey || EOS || align=right | 2.8 km || 
|-id=397 bgcolor=#d6d6d6
| 311397 ||  || — || October 7, 2005 || Kitt Peak || Spacewatch || — || align=right | 2.5 km || 
|-id=398 bgcolor=#d6d6d6
| 311398 ||  || — || October 9, 2005 || Kitt Peak || Spacewatch || EOS || align=right | 2.2 km || 
|-id=399 bgcolor=#d6d6d6
| 311399 ||  || — || October 9, 2005 || Kitt Peak || Spacewatch || — || align=right | 3.6 km || 
|-id=400 bgcolor=#d6d6d6
| 311400 ||  || — || October 10, 2005 || Anderson Mesa || LONEOS || — || align=right | 3.9 km || 
|}

311401–311500 

|-bgcolor=#d6d6d6
| 311401 ||  || — || October 13, 2005 || Kitt Peak || Spacewatch || HYG || align=right | 2.6 km || 
|-id=402 bgcolor=#d6d6d6
| 311402 ||  || — || October 26, 2005 || Ottmarsheim || C. Rinner || HYG || align=right | 3.8 km || 
|-id=403 bgcolor=#d6d6d6
| 311403 ||  || — || October 21, 2005 || Palomar || NEAT || — || align=right | 3.5 km || 
|-id=404 bgcolor=#d6d6d6
| 311404 ||  || — || October 21, 2005 || Palomar || NEAT || — || align=right | 3.3 km || 
|-id=405 bgcolor=#d6d6d6
| 311405 ||  || — || October 22, 2005 || Kitt Peak || Spacewatch || THM || align=right | 3.0 km || 
|-id=406 bgcolor=#d6d6d6
| 311406 ||  || — || October 22, 2005 || Kitt Peak || Spacewatch || — || align=right | 3.5 km || 
|-id=407 bgcolor=#d6d6d6
| 311407 ||  || — || October 23, 2005 || Kitt Peak || Spacewatch || — || align=right | 3.1 km || 
|-id=408 bgcolor=#d6d6d6
| 311408 ||  || — || October 23, 2005 || Kitt Peak || Spacewatch || — || align=right | 4.3 km || 
|-id=409 bgcolor=#d6d6d6
| 311409 ||  || — || October 23, 2005 || Kitt Peak || Spacewatch || — || align=right | 3.2 km || 
|-id=410 bgcolor=#d6d6d6
| 311410 ||  || — || October 23, 2005 || Kitt Peak || Spacewatch || 637 || align=right | 2.9 km || 
|-id=411 bgcolor=#d6d6d6
| 311411 ||  || — || October 23, 2005 || Catalina || CSS || VER || align=right | 4.3 km || 
|-id=412 bgcolor=#d6d6d6
| 311412 ||  || — || October 25, 2005 || Mount Lemmon || Mount Lemmon Survey || — || align=right | 3.7 km || 
|-id=413 bgcolor=#d6d6d6
| 311413 ||  || — || October 25, 2005 || Mount Lemmon || Mount Lemmon Survey || — || align=right | 3.0 km || 
|-id=414 bgcolor=#d6d6d6
| 311414 ||  || — || October 23, 2005 || Catalina || CSS || — || align=right | 3.8 km || 
|-id=415 bgcolor=#d6d6d6
| 311415 ||  || — || October 23, 2005 || Catalina || CSS || — || align=right | 3.3 km || 
|-id=416 bgcolor=#d6d6d6
| 311416 ||  || — || October 24, 2005 || Palomar || NEAT || — || align=right | 4.1 km || 
|-id=417 bgcolor=#d6d6d6
| 311417 ||  || — || October 24, 2005 || Palomar || NEAT || — || align=right | 4.6 km || 
|-id=418 bgcolor=#d6d6d6
| 311418 ||  || — || October 25, 2005 || Catalina || CSS || — || align=right | 2.4 km || 
|-id=419 bgcolor=#d6d6d6
| 311419 ||  || — || October 22, 2005 || Kitt Peak || Spacewatch || — || align=right | 3.2 km || 
|-id=420 bgcolor=#d6d6d6
| 311420 ||  || — || October 22, 2005 || Kitt Peak || Spacewatch || HYG || align=right | 3.1 km || 
|-id=421 bgcolor=#d6d6d6
| 311421 ||  || — || October 22, 2005 || Kitt Peak || Spacewatch || — || align=right | 3.6 km || 
|-id=422 bgcolor=#d6d6d6
| 311422 ||  || — || October 22, 2005 || Palomar || NEAT || — || align=right | 3.1 km || 
|-id=423 bgcolor=#d6d6d6
| 311423 ||  || — || October 24, 2005 || Kitt Peak || Spacewatch || — || align=right | 3.0 km || 
|-id=424 bgcolor=#d6d6d6
| 311424 ||  || — || October 24, 2005 || Kitt Peak || Spacewatch || — || align=right | 3.5 km || 
|-id=425 bgcolor=#d6d6d6
| 311425 ||  || — || October 24, 2005 || Kitt Peak || Spacewatch || THM || align=right | 2.0 km || 
|-id=426 bgcolor=#d6d6d6
| 311426 ||  || — || October 24, 2005 || Kitt Peak || Spacewatch || — || align=right | 2.9 km || 
|-id=427 bgcolor=#d6d6d6
| 311427 ||  || — || October 24, 2005 || Palomar || NEAT || CRO || align=right | 5.7 km || 
|-id=428 bgcolor=#d6d6d6
| 311428 ||  || — || October 25, 2005 || Anderson Mesa || LONEOS || — || align=right | 2.6 km || 
|-id=429 bgcolor=#d6d6d6
| 311429 ||  || — || October 24, 2005 || Kitt Peak || Spacewatch || — || align=right | 2.7 km || 
|-id=430 bgcolor=#d6d6d6
| 311430 ||  || — || October 24, 2005 || Kitt Peak || Spacewatch || EOS || align=right | 2.1 km || 
|-id=431 bgcolor=#d6d6d6
| 311431 ||  || — || October 24, 2005 || Kitt Peak || Spacewatch || VER || align=right | 3.2 km || 
|-id=432 bgcolor=#d6d6d6
| 311432 ||  || — || October 24, 2005 || Kitt Peak || Spacewatch || — || align=right | 3.5 km || 
|-id=433 bgcolor=#d6d6d6
| 311433 ||  || — || October 24, 2005 || Kitt Peak || Spacewatch || — || align=right | 3.5 km || 
|-id=434 bgcolor=#d6d6d6
| 311434 ||  || — || October 25, 2005 || Kitt Peak || Spacewatch || — || align=right | 3.3 km || 
|-id=435 bgcolor=#d6d6d6
| 311435 ||  || — || October 23, 2005 || Catalina || CSS || CHA || align=right | 2.8 km || 
|-id=436 bgcolor=#d6d6d6
| 311436 ||  || — || October 25, 2005 || Kitt Peak || Spacewatch || — || align=right | 2.8 km || 
|-id=437 bgcolor=#d6d6d6
| 311437 ||  || — || October 25, 2005 || Kitt Peak || Spacewatch || HYG || align=right | 3.1 km || 
|-id=438 bgcolor=#d6d6d6
| 311438 ||  || — || October 25, 2005 || Kitt Peak || Spacewatch || — || align=right | 3.1 km || 
|-id=439 bgcolor=#d6d6d6
| 311439 ||  || — || October 25, 2005 || Kitt Peak || Spacewatch || EOS || align=right | 2.0 km || 
|-id=440 bgcolor=#d6d6d6
| 311440 ||  || — || October 25, 2005 || Kitt Peak || Spacewatch || ELF || align=right | 3.5 km || 
|-id=441 bgcolor=#d6d6d6
| 311441 ||  || — || October 25, 2005 || Kitt Peak || Spacewatch || ALA || align=right | 3.5 km || 
|-id=442 bgcolor=#d6d6d6
| 311442 ||  || — || October 25, 2005 || Kitt Peak || Spacewatch || — || align=right | 3.9 km || 
|-id=443 bgcolor=#d6d6d6
| 311443 ||  || — || October 25, 2005 || Kitt Peak || Spacewatch || — || align=right | 2.9 km || 
|-id=444 bgcolor=#d6d6d6
| 311444 ||  || — || October 26, 2005 || Kitt Peak || Spacewatch || — || align=right | 4.8 km || 
|-id=445 bgcolor=#d6d6d6
| 311445 ||  || — || October 24, 2005 || Kitt Peak || Spacewatch || — || align=right | 3.8 km || 
|-id=446 bgcolor=#d6d6d6
| 311446 ||  || — || October 26, 2005 || Kitt Peak || Spacewatch || THM || align=right | 2.5 km || 
|-id=447 bgcolor=#d6d6d6
| 311447 ||  || — || October 28, 2005 || Mount Lemmon || Mount Lemmon Survey || — || align=right | 4.6 km || 
|-id=448 bgcolor=#d6d6d6
| 311448 ||  || — || October 26, 2005 || Kitt Peak || Spacewatch || — || align=right | 4.4 km || 
|-id=449 bgcolor=#d6d6d6
| 311449 ||  || — || October 26, 2005 || Kitt Peak || Spacewatch || — || align=right | 3.2 km || 
|-id=450 bgcolor=#d6d6d6
| 311450 ||  || — || October 26, 2005 || Kitt Peak || Spacewatch || VER || align=right | 3.1 km || 
|-id=451 bgcolor=#d6d6d6
| 311451 ||  || — || October 27, 2005 || Kitt Peak || Spacewatch || — || align=right | 3.6 km || 
|-id=452 bgcolor=#d6d6d6
| 311452 ||  || — || October 29, 2005 || Mount Lemmon || Mount Lemmon Survey || — || align=right | 2.8 km || 
|-id=453 bgcolor=#d6d6d6
| 311453 ||  || — || October 31, 2005 || Mount Lemmon || Mount Lemmon Survey || — || align=right | 2.6 km || 
|-id=454 bgcolor=#d6d6d6
| 311454 ||  || — || October 29, 2005 || Catalina || CSS || — || align=right | 3.5 km || 
|-id=455 bgcolor=#d6d6d6
| 311455 ||  || — || October 29, 2005 || Catalina || CSS || CRO || align=right | 5.1 km || 
|-id=456 bgcolor=#d6d6d6
| 311456 ||  || — || October 27, 2005 || Kitt Peak || Spacewatch || — || align=right | 4.0 km || 
|-id=457 bgcolor=#d6d6d6
| 311457 ||  || — || October 28, 2005 || Catalina || CSS || — || align=right | 3.7 km || 
|-id=458 bgcolor=#d6d6d6
| 311458 ||  || — || October 29, 2005 || Mount Lemmon || Mount Lemmon Survey || — || align=right | 4.4 km || 
|-id=459 bgcolor=#d6d6d6
| 311459 ||  || — || October 28, 2005 || Mount Lemmon || Mount Lemmon Survey || EOS || align=right | 2.4 km || 
|-id=460 bgcolor=#d6d6d6
| 311460 ||  || — || October 25, 2005 || Kitt Peak || Spacewatch || — || align=right | 3.9 km || 
|-id=461 bgcolor=#d6d6d6
| 311461 ||  || — || October 28, 2005 || Kitt Peak || Spacewatch || EOS || align=right | 2.3 km || 
|-id=462 bgcolor=#d6d6d6
| 311462 ||  || — || October 28, 2005 || Kitt Peak || Spacewatch || — || align=right | 3.6 km || 
|-id=463 bgcolor=#d6d6d6
| 311463 ||  || — || October 29, 2005 || Catalina || CSS || EOS || align=right | 2.4 km || 
|-id=464 bgcolor=#d6d6d6
| 311464 ||  || — || October 28, 2005 || Campo Imperatore || CINEOS || HYG || align=right | 2.9 km || 
|-id=465 bgcolor=#d6d6d6
| 311465 ||  || — || October 29, 2005 || Catalina || CSS || EOS || align=right | 2.8 km || 
|-id=466 bgcolor=#d6d6d6
| 311466 ||  || — || October 30, 2005 || Mount Lemmon || Mount Lemmon Survey || EOS || align=right | 2.6 km || 
|-id=467 bgcolor=#d6d6d6
| 311467 ||  || — || October 31, 2005 || Kitt Peak || Spacewatch || EOS || align=right | 3.6 km || 
|-id=468 bgcolor=#d6d6d6
| 311468 ||  || — || October 22, 2005 || Palomar || NEAT || EUP || align=right | 6.4 km || 
|-id=469 bgcolor=#d6d6d6
| 311469 ||  || — || October 22, 2005 || Catalina || CSS || — || align=right | 4.5 km || 
|-id=470 bgcolor=#d6d6d6
| 311470 ||  || — || October 23, 2005 || Catalina || CSS || — || align=right | 3.9 km || 
|-id=471 bgcolor=#d6d6d6
| 311471 ||  || — || October 23, 2005 || Catalina || CSS || — || align=right | 4.7 km || 
|-id=472 bgcolor=#d6d6d6
| 311472 ||  || — || October 26, 2005 || Socorro || LINEAR || THB || align=right | 4.3 km || 
|-id=473 bgcolor=#d6d6d6
| 311473 ||  || — || October 27, 2005 || Palomar || NEAT || — || align=right | 4.7 km || 
|-id=474 bgcolor=#d6d6d6
| 311474 ||  || — || October 27, 2005 || Socorro || LINEAR || — || align=right | 4.3 km || 
|-id=475 bgcolor=#d6d6d6
| 311475 ||  || — || October 27, 2005 || Catalina || CSS || — || align=right | 4.1 km || 
|-id=476 bgcolor=#d6d6d6
| 311476 ||  || — || October 28, 2005 || Catalina || CSS || — || align=right | 2.9 km || 
|-id=477 bgcolor=#d6d6d6
| 311477 ||  || — || October 28, 2005 || Kitt Peak || Spacewatch || — || align=right | 5.1 km || 
|-id=478 bgcolor=#d6d6d6
| 311478 ||  || — || October 29, 2005 || Mount Lemmon || Mount Lemmon Survey || — || align=right | 3.1 km || 
|-id=479 bgcolor=#d6d6d6
| 311479 ||  || — || October 29, 2005 || Mount Lemmon || Mount Lemmon Survey || — || align=right | 3.2 km || 
|-id=480 bgcolor=#d6d6d6
| 311480 ||  || — || November 1, 2005 || Catalina || CSS || — || align=right | 3.9 km || 
|-id=481 bgcolor=#d6d6d6
| 311481 ||  || — || November 4, 2005 || Kitt Peak || Spacewatch || — || align=right | 2.9 km || 
|-id=482 bgcolor=#d6d6d6
| 311482 ||  || — || October 23, 2005 || Palomar || NEAT || HYG || align=right | 3.6 km || 
|-id=483 bgcolor=#d6d6d6
| 311483 ||  || — || November 5, 2005 || Kitt Peak || Spacewatch || — || align=right | 2.7 km || 
|-id=484 bgcolor=#d6d6d6
| 311484 ||  || — || November 2, 2005 || Socorro || LINEAR || — || align=right | 3.8 km || 
|-id=485 bgcolor=#d6d6d6
| 311485 ||  || — || November 3, 2005 || Socorro || LINEAR || — || align=right | 5.3 km || 
|-id=486 bgcolor=#d6d6d6
| 311486 ||  || — || November 4, 2005 || Catalina || CSS || — || align=right | 3.6 km || 
|-id=487 bgcolor=#d6d6d6
| 311487 ||  || — || November 5, 2005 || Kitt Peak || Spacewatch || HYG || align=right | 2.7 km || 
|-id=488 bgcolor=#d6d6d6
| 311488 ||  || — || November 5, 2005 || Kitt Peak || Spacewatch || — || align=right | 4.6 km || 
|-id=489 bgcolor=#d6d6d6
| 311489 ||  || — || November 6, 2005 || Mount Lemmon || Mount Lemmon Survey || — || align=right | 2.6 km || 
|-id=490 bgcolor=#d6d6d6
| 311490 ||  || — || November 12, 2005 || Socorro || LINEAR || — || align=right | 5.7 km || 
|-id=491 bgcolor=#fefefe
| 311491 ||  || — || November 4, 2005 || Catalina || CSS || H || align=right data-sort-value="0.80" | 800 m || 
|-id=492 bgcolor=#d6d6d6
| 311492 ||  || — || November 18, 2005 || Palomar || NEAT || ALA || align=right | 6.2 km || 
|-id=493 bgcolor=#d6d6d6
| 311493 ||  || — || November 22, 2005 || Kitt Peak || Spacewatch || THM || align=right | 2.3 km || 
|-id=494 bgcolor=#d6d6d6
| 311494 ||  || — || November 21, 2005 || Kitt Peak || Spacewatch || EUP || align=right | 4.1 km || 
|-id=495 bgcolor=#d6d6d6
| 311495 ||  || — || November 21, 2005 || Kitt Peak || Spacewatch || — || align=right | 2.7 km || 
|-id=496 bgcolor=#d6d6d6
| 311496 ||  || — || November 21, 2005 || Kitt Peak || Spacewatch || LUT || align=right | 4.3 km || 
|-id=497 bgcolor=#d6d6d6
| 311497 ||  || — || November 25, 2005 || Kitt Peak || Spacewatch || — || align=right | 3.7 km || 
|-id=498 bgcolor=#d6d6d6
| 311498 ||  || — || November 29, 2005 || Socorro || LINEAR || EUP || align=right | 5.2 km || 
|-id=499 bgcolor=#d6d6d6
| 311499 ||  || — || November 30, 2005 || Mayhill || iTelescope Obs. || — || align=right | 4.7 km || 
|-id=500 bgcolor=#d6d6d6
| 311500 ||  || — || November 25, 2005 || Kitt Peak || Spacewatch || EUP || align=right | 4.2 km || 
|}

311501–311600 

|-bgcolor=#d6d6d6
| 311501 ||  || — || November 22, 2005 || Kitt Peak || Spacewatch || — || align=right | 3.3 km || 
|-id=502 bgcolor=#d6d6d6
| 311502 ||  || — || November 25, 2005 || Mount Lemmon || Mount Lemmon Survey || — || align=right | 5.2 km || 
|-id=503 bgcolor=#d6d6d6
| 311503 ||  || — || November 28, 2005 || Palomar || NEAT || — || align=right | 3.5 km || 
|-id=504 bgcolor=#d6d6d6
| 311504 ||  || — || November 30, 2005 || Mount Lemmon || Mount Lemmon Survey || — || align=right | 4.0 km || 
|-id=505 bgcolor=#d6d6d6
| 311505 ||  || — || November 28, 2005 || Socorro || LINEAR || URS || align=right | 4.6 km || 
|-id=506 bgcolor=#d6d6d6
| 311506 ||  || — || November 28, 2005 || Socorro || LINEAR || — || align=right | 2.9 km || 
|-id=507 bgcolor=#d6d6d6
| 311507 ||  || — || November 30, 2005 || Mount Lemmon || Mount Lemmon Survey || THM || align=right | 2.5 km || 
|-id=508 bgcolor=#d6d6d6
| 311508 ||  || — || November 26, 2005 || Mount Lemmon || Mount Lemmon Survey || — || align=right | 3.2 km || 
|-id=509 bgcolor=#d6d6d6
| 311509 ||  || — || November 26, 2005 || Mount Lemmon || Mount Lemmon Survey || — || align=right | 3.4 km || 
|-id=510 bgcolor=#d6d6d6
| 311510 ||  || — || November 24, 2005 || Palomar || NEAT || TIR || align=right | 3.3 km || 
|-id=511 bgcolor=#d6d6d6
| 311511 ||  || — || November 28, 2005 || Socorro || LINEAR || — || align=right | 3.7 km || 
|-id=512 bgcolor=#d6d6d6
| 311512 ||  || — || November 28, 2005 || Socorro || LINEAR || — || align=right | 4.2 km || 
|-id=513 bgcolor=#d6d6d6
| 311513 ||  || — || November 29, 2005 || Palomar || NEAT || — || align=right | 6.0 km || 
|-id=514 bgcolor=#d6d6d6
| 311514 ||  || — || November 29, 2005 || Palomar || NEAT || — || align=right | 4.8 km || 
|-id=515 bgcolor=#d6d6d6
| 311515 ||  || — || November 5, 2005 || Mount Lemmon || Mount Lemmon Survey || — || align=right | 2.9 km || 
|-id=516 bgcolor=#d6d6d6
| 311516 ||  || — || November 30, 2005 || Mount Lemmon || Mount Lemmon Survey || THM || align=right | 2.7 km || 
|-id=517 bgcolor=#d6d6d6
| 311517 ||  || — || November 26, 2005 || Catalina || CSS || EUP || align=right | 5.8 km || 
|-id=518 bgcolor=#d6d6d6
| 311518 ||  || — || November 21, 2005 || Anderson Mesa || LONEOS || — || align=right | 5.1 km || 
|-id=519 bgcolor=#d6d6d6
| 311519 ||  || — || November 20, 2005 || Palomar || NEAT || EUP || align=right | 5.7 km || 
|-id=520 bgcolor=#d6d6d6
| 311520 ||  || — || December 1, 2005 || Mount Lemmon || Mount Lemmon Survey || EOS || align=right | 2.3 km || 
|-id=521 bgcolor=#d6d6d6
| 311521 ||  || — || December 1, 2005 || Socorro || LINEAR || THM || align=right | 2.9 km || 
|-id=522 bgcolor=#d6d6d6
| 311522 ||  || — || December 4, 2005 || Kitt Peak || Spacewatch || — || align=right | 3.9 km || 
|-id=523 bgcolor=#d6d6d6
| 311523 ||  || — || December 9, 2005 || Gnosca || S. Sposetti || — || align=right | 3.3 km || 
|-id=524 bgcolor=#d6d6d6
| 311524 ||  || — || December 7, 2005 || Catalina || CSS || — || align=right | 4.3 km || 
|-id=525 bgcolor=#d6d6d6
| 311525 ||  || — || December 10, 2005 || Kitt Peak || Spacewatch || — || align=right | 3.1 km || 
|-id=526 bgcolor=#d6d6d6
| 311526 ||  || — || December 24, 2005 || Kitt Peak || Spacewatch || 7:4 || align=right | 2.9 km || 
|-id=527 bgcolor=#d6d6d6
| 311527 ||  || — || December 24, 2005 || Kitt Peak || Spacewatch || — || align=right | 4.3 km || 
|-id=528 bgcolor=#d6d6d6
| 311528 ||  || — || December 21, 2005 || Catalina || CSS || HYG || align=right | 3.2 km || 
|-id=529 bgcolor=#d6d6d6
| 311529 ||  || — || December 25, 2005 || Kitt Peak || Spacewatch || — || align=right | 5.1 km || 
|-id=530 bgcolor=#d6d6d6
| 311530 ||  || — || December 25, 2005 || Kitt Peak || Spacewatch || 7:4 || align=right | 4.1 km || 
|-id=531 bgcolor=#d6d6d6
| 311531 ||  || — || December 26, 2005 || Mount Lemmon || Mount Lemmon Survey || 7:4 || align=right | 5.3 km || 
|-id=532 bgcolor=#d6d6d6
| 311532 ||  || — || December 24, 2005 || Kitt Peak || Spacewatch || HYG || align=right | 3.0 km || 
|-id=533 bgcolor=#d6d6d6
| 311533 ||  || — || December 25, 2005 || Kitt Peak || Spacewatch || — || align=right | 3.6 km || 
|-id=534 bgcolor=#d6d6d6
| 311534 ||  || — || December 25, 2005 || Kitt Peak || Spacewatch || — || align=right | 3.7 km || 
|-id=535 bgcolor=#d6d6d6
| 311535 ||  || — || December 25, 2005 || Mount Lemmon || Mount Lemmon Survey || — || align=right | 3.5 km || 
|-id=536 bgcolor=#fefefe
| 311536 ||  || — || December 25, 2005 || Kitt Peak || Spacewatch || — || align=right data-sort-value="0.82" | 820 m || 
|-id=537 bgcolor=#d6d6d6
| 311537 ||  || — || December 28, 2005 || Catalina || CSS || — || align=right | 4.5 km || 
|-id=538 bgcolor=#d6d6d6
| 311538 ||  || — || December 25, 2005 || Kitt Peak || Spacewatch || — || align=right | 3.5 km || 
|-id=539 bgcolor=#d6d6d6
| 311539 ||  || — || December 24, 2005 || Socorro || LINEAR || URS || align=right | 5.5 km || 
|-id=540 bgcolor=#d6d6d6
| 311540 ||  || — || December 26, 2005 || Kitt Peak || Spacewatch || — || align=right | 4.8 km || 
|-id=541 bgcolor=#d6d6d6
| 311541 ||  || — || December 29, 2005 || Palomar || NEAT || — || align=right | 5.8 km || 
|-id=542 bgcolor=#d6d6d6
| 311542 ||  || — || December 30, 2005 || Catalina || CSS || — || align=right | 3.4 km || 
|-id=543 bgcolor=#d6d6d6
| 311543 ||  || — || December 29, 2005 || Palomar || NEAT || TIR || align=right | 3.9 km || 
|-id=544 bgcolor=#d6d6d6
| 311544 ||  || — || December 27, 2005 || Mount Lemmon || Mount Lemmon Survey || HYG || align=right | 3.1 km || 
|-id=545 bgcolor=#d6d6d6
| 311545 ||  || — || December 28, 2005 || Kitt Peak || Spacewatch || — || align=right | 2.8 km || 
|-id=546 bgcolor=#d6d6d6
| 311546 ||  || — || December 28, 2005 || Kitt Peak || Spacewatch || 7:4 || align=right | 4.1 km || 
|-id=547 bgcolor=#d6d6d6
| 311547 ||  || — || December 25, 2005 || Catalina || CSS || — || align=right | 4.7 km || 
|-id=548 bgcolor=#d6d6d6
| 311548 ||  || — || January 5, 2006 || Anderson Mesa || LONEOS || 7:4 || align=right | 5.7 km || 
|-id=549 bgcolor=#d6d6d6
| 311549 ||  || — || January 5, 2006 || Mount Lemmon || Mount Lemmon Survey || — || align=right | 3.4 km || 
|-id=550 bgcolor=#fefefe
| 311550 ||  || — || January 5, 2006 || Kitt Peak || Spacewatch || — || align=right data-sort-value="0.60" | 600 m || 
|-id=551 bgcolor=#d6d6d6
| 311551 ||  || — || January 6, 2006 || Mount Lemmon || Mount Lemmon Survey || HYG || align=right | 4.0 km || 
|-id=552 bgcolor=#fefefe
| 311552 ||  || — || January 25, 2006 || Kitt Peak || Spacewatch || — || align=right data-sort-value="0.72" | 720 m || 
|-id=553 bgcolor=#d6d6d6
| 311553 ||  || — || January 28, 2006 || 7300 || W. K. Y. Yeung || — || align=right | 3.9 km || 
|-id=554 bgcolor=#FFC2E0
| 311554 ||  || — || January 31, 2006 || Siding Spring || SSS || ATE || align=right data-sort-value="0.38" | 380 m || 
|-id=555 bgcolor=#FFC2E0
| 311555 ||  || — || January 31, 2006 || Kitt Peak || Spacewatch || APOcritical || align=right data-sort-value="0.74" | 740 m || 
|-id=556 bgcolor=#fefefe
| 311556 ||  || — || January 26, 2006 || Catalina || CSS || — || align=right data-sort-value="0.93" | 930 m || 
|-id=557 bgcolor=#fefefe
| 311557 ||  || — || January 30, 2006 || Kitt Peak || Spacewatch || — || align=right data-sort-value="0.82" | 820 m || 
|-id=558 bgcolor=#d6d6d6
| 311558 ||  || — || January 26, 2006 || Catalina || CSS || — || align=right | 3.7 km || 
|-id=559 bgcolor=#fefefe
| 311559 ||  || — || January 30, 2006 || Kitt Peak || Spacewatch || — || align=right data-sort-value="0.77" | 770 m || 
|-id=560 bgcolor=#fefefe
| 311560 ||  || — || January 30, 2006 || Kitt Peak || Spacewatch || — || align=right | 1.0 km || 
|-id=561 bgcolor=#fefefe
| 311561 ||  || — || January 31, 2006 || Kitt Peak || Spacewatch || — || align=right data-sort-value="0.61" | 610 m || 
|-id=562 bgcolor=#fefefe
| 311562 ||  || — || February 1, 2006 || Mount Lemmon || Mount Lemmon Survey || — || align=right data-sort-value="0.98" | 980 m || 
|-id=563 bgcolor=#fefefe
| 311563 ||  || — || February 2, 2006 || Mount Lemmon || Mount Lemmon Survey || — || align=right data-sort-value="0.57" | 570 m || 
|-id=564 bgcolor=#fefefe
| 311564 ||  || — || February 21, 2006 || Mount Lemmon || Mount Lemmon Survey || — || align=right data-sort-value="0.83" | 830 m || 
|-id=565 bgcolor=#fefefe
| 311565 ||  || — || February 20, 2006 || Catalina || CSS || — || align=right data-sort-value="0.90" | 900 m || 
|-id=566 bgcolor=#fefefe
| 311566 ||  || — || February 25, 2006 || Kitt Peak || Spacewatch || FLO || align=right data-sort-value="0.80" | 800 m || 
|-id=567 bgcolor=#fefefe
| 311567 ||  || — || February 27, 2006 || Mount Lemmon || Mount Lemmon Survey || — || align=right data-sort-value="0.83" | 830 m || 
|-id=568 bgcolor=#fefefe
| 311568 ||  || — || February 20, 2006 || Kitt Peak || Spacewatch || — || align=right data-sort-value="0.87" | 870 m || 
|-id=569 bgcolor=#fefefe
| 311569 ||  || — || March 3, 2006 || Catalina || CSS || — || align=right | 1.1 km || 
|-id=570 bgcolor=#fefefe
| 311570 ||  || — || March 23, 2006 || Mount Lemmon || Mount Lemmon Survey || — || align=right data-sort-value="0.94" | 940 m || 
|-id=571 bgcolor=#fefefe
| 311571 ||  || — || March 23, 2006 || Kitt Peak || Spacewatch || — || align=right | 1.0 km || 
|-id=572 bgcolor=#fefefe
| 311572 ||  || — || March 26, 2006 || Mount Lemmon || Mount Lemmon Survey || FLO || align=right data-sort-value="0.68" | 680 m || 
|-id=573 bgcolor=#fefefe
| 311573 ||  || — || April 2, 2006 || Kitt Peak || Spacewatch || — || align=right | 1.1 km || 
|-id=574 bgcolor=#fefefe
| 311574 ||  || — || April 2, 2006 || Kitt Peak || Spacewatch || — || align=right data-sort-value="0.81" | 810 m || 
|-id=575 bgcolor=#fefefe
| 311575 ||  || — || April 2, 2006 || Kitt Peak || Spacewatch || — || align=right data-sort-value="0.94" | 940 m || 
|-id=576 bgcolor=#d6d6d6
| 311576 ||  || — || February 6, 1995 || Kitt Peak || Spacewatch || THM || align=right | 2.5 km || 
|-id=577 bgcolor=#fefefe
| 311577 ||  || — || April 2, 2006 || Mount Lemmon || Mount Lemmon Survey || FLO || align=right data-sort-value="0.98" | 980 m || 
|-id=578 bgcolor=#fefefe
| 311578 ||  || — || April 6, 2006 || Catalina || CSS || FLO || align=right data-sort-value="0.83" | 830 m || 
|-id=579 bgcolor=#fefefe
| 311579 ||  || — || April 19, 2006 || Catalina || CSS || V || align=right data-sort-value="0.87" | 870 m || 
|-id=580 bgcolor=#fefefe
| 311580 ||  || — || April 19, 2006 || Palomar || NEAT || — || align=right | 1.3 km || 
|-id=581 bgcolor=#fefefe
| 311581 ||  || — || April 19, 2006 || Catalina || CSS || FLO || align=right data-sort-value="0.81" | 810 m || 
|-id=582 bgcolor=#fefefe
| 311582 ||  || — || April 25, 2006 || Kitt Peak || Spacewatch || V || align=right data-sort-value="0.76" | 760 m || 
|-id=583 bgcolor=#fefefe
| 311583 ||  || — || April 25, 2006 || Kitt Peak || Spacewatch || — || align=right | 1.0 km || 
|-id=584 bgcolor=#fefefe
| 311584 ||  || — || April 24, 2006 || Kitt Peak || Spacewatch || CLA || align=right | 2.0 km || 
|-id=585 bgcolor=#fefefe
| 311585 ||  || — || April 25, 2006 || Kitt Peak || Spacewatch || FLO || align=right data-sort-value="0.81" | 810 m || 
|-id=586 bgcolor=#fefefe
| 311586 ||  || — || April 30, 2006 || Kitt Peak || Spacewatch || FLO || align=right data-sort-value="0.73" | 730 m || 
|-id=587 bgcolor=#fefefe
| 311587 ||  || — || April 30, 2006 || Kitt Peak || Spacewatch || V || align=right data-sort-value="0.80" | 800 m || 
|-id=588 bgcolor=#fefefe
| 311588 ||  || — || April 30, 2006 || Kitt Peak || Spacewatch || V || align=right data-sort-value="0.87" | 870 m || 
|-id=589 bgcolor=#fefefe
| 311589 ||  || — || April 21, 2006 || Catalina || CSS || — || align=right data-sort-value="0.98" | 980 m || 
|-id=590 bgcolor=#fefefe
| 311590 ||  || — || April 24, 2006 || Mount Lemmon || Mount Lemmon Survey || — || align=right | 1.1 km || 
|-id=591 bgcolor=#fefefe
| 311591 ||  || — || May 4, 2006 || Kitt Peak || Spacewatch || — || align=right data-sort-value="0.99" | 990 m || 
|-id=592 bgcolor=#C2FFFF
| 311592 ||  || — || May 9, 2006 || Mount Lemmon || Mount Lemmon Survey || L4 || align=right | 13 km || 
|-id=593 bgcolor=#fefefe
| 311593 ||  || — || May 8, 2006 || Mount Lemmon || Mount Lemmon Survey || — || align=right data-sort-value="0.83" | 830 m || 
|-id=594 bgcolor=#fefefe
| 311594 ||  || — || May 16, 2006 || Siding Spring || SSS || — || align=right | 1.0 km || 
|-id=595 bgcolor=#fefefe
| 311595 ||  || — || May 20, 2006 || Kitt Peak || Spacewatch || — || align=right | 1.1 km || 
|-id=596 bgcolor=#fefefe
| 311596 ||  || — || May 6, 2006 || Mount Lemmon || Mount Lemmon Survey || V || align=right data-sort-value="0.57" | 570 m || 
|-id=597 bgcolor=#fefefe
| 311597 ||  || — || May 21, 2006 || Kitt Peak || Spacewatch || — || align=right data-sort-value="0.91" | 910 m || 
|-id=598 bgcolor=#fefefe
| 311598 ||  || — || May 22, 2006 || Kitt Peak || Spacewatch || — || align=right data-sort-value="0.83" | 830 m || 
|-id=599 bgcolor=#fefefe
| 311599 ||  || — || May 22, 2006 || Kitt Peak || Spacewatch || V || align=right data-sort-value="0.82" | 820 m || 
|-id=600 bgcolor=#fefefe
| 311600 ||  || — || May 24, 2006 || Mount Lemmon || Mount Lemmon Survey || FLO || align=right data-sort-value="0.88" | 880 m || 
|}

311601–311700 

|-bgcolor=#fefefe
| 311601 ||  || — || May 22, 2006 || Kitt Peak || Spacewatch || FLO || align=right data-sort-value="0.83" | 830 m || 
|-id=602 bgcolor=#fefefe
| 311602 ||  || — || May 24, 2006 || Mount Lemmon || Mount Lemmon Survey || — || align=right data-sort-value="0.82" | 820 m || 
|-id=603 bgcolor=#fefefe
| 311603 ||  || — || May 21, 2006 || Siding Spring || SSS || — || align=right | 2.2 km || 
|-id=604 bgcolor=#fefefe
| 311604 ||  || — || May 25, 2006 || Mauna Kea || P. A. Wiegert || NYS || align=right data-sort-value="0.73" | 730 m || 
|-id=605 bgcolor=#fefefe
| 311605 ||  || — || June 18, 2006 || Kitt Peak || Spacewatch || — || align=right | 1.2 km || 
|-id=606 bgcolor=#fefefe
| 311606 ||  || — || June 18, 2006 || Kitt Peak || Spacewatch || — || align=right | 1.2 km || 
|-id=607 bgcolor=#E9E9E9
| 311607 ||  || — || June 19, 2006 || Mount Lemmon || Mount Lemmon Survey || BRG || align=right | 1.6 km || 
|-id=608 bgcolor=#E9E9E9
| 311608 ||  || — || July 20, 2006 || Socorro || LINEAR || JUN || align=right | 1.7 km || 
|-id=609 bgcolor=#E9E9E9
| 311609 ||  || — || July 30, 2006 || Reedy Creek || J. Broughton || — || align=right | 2.0 km || 
|-id=610 bgcolor=#E9E9E9
| 311610 ||  || — || July 21, 2006 || Catalina || CSS || — || align=right | 3.9 km || 
|-id=611 bgcolor=#E9E9E9
| 311611 ||  || — || July 18, 2006 || Siding Spring || SSS || — || align=right | 1.6 km || 
|-id=612 bgcolor=#E9E9E9
| 311612 ||  || — || August 13, 2006 || Palomar || NEAT || — || align=right | 1.7 km || 
|-id=613 bgcolor=#E9E9E9
| 311613 ||  || — || August 13, 2006 || Palomar || NEAT || — || align=right | 2.1 km || 
|-id=614 bgcolor=#E9E9E9
| 311614 ||  || — || August 10, 2006 || Palomar || NEAT || — || align=right | 2.6 km || 
|-id=615 bgcolor=#C2FFFF
| 311615 ||  || — || August 14, 2006 || Siding Spring || SSS || L4 || align=right | 13 km || 
|-id=616 bgcolor=#E9E9E9
| 311616 ||  || — || August 14, 2006 || Palomar || NEAT || — || align=right | 1.5 km || 
|-id=617 bgcolor=#E9E9E9
| 311617 ||  || — || August 12, 2006 || Palomar || NEAT || — || align=right | 2.4 km || 
|-id=618 bgcolor=#E9E9E9
| 311618 ||  || — || August 18, 2006 || Socorro || LINEAR || — || align=right | 2.9 km || 
|-id=619 bgcolor=#E9E9E9
| 311619 ||  || — || August 18, 2006 || Reedy Creek || J. Broughton || JUN || align=right | 1.5 km || 
|-id=620 bgcolor=#E9E9E9
| 311620 ||  || — || August 18, 2006 || Kitt Peak || Spacewatch || — || align=right | 2.0 km || 
|-id=621 bgcolor=#fefefe
| 311621 ||  || — || August 16, 2006 || Siding Spring || SSS || — || align=right data-sort-value="0.92" | 920 m || 
|-id=622 bgcolor=#E9E9E9
| 311622 ||  || — || August 18, 2006 || Anderson Mesa || LONEOS || — || align=right | 2.4 km || 
|-id=623 bgcolor=#E9E9E9
| 311623 ||  || — || August 19, 2006 || Anderson Mesa || LONEOS || JUN || align=right | 1.6 km || 
|-id=624 bgcolor=#E9E9E9
| 311624 ||  || — || August 19, 2006 || Anderson Mesa || LONEOS || — || align=right | 4.1 km || 
|-id=625 bgcolor=#E9E9E9
| 311625 ||  || — || August 20, 2006 || Dax || Dax Obs. || — || align=right | 3.0 km || 
|-id=626 bgcolor=#E9E9E9
| 311626 ||  || — || August 20, 2006 || Kitt Peak || Spacewatch || — || align=right | 1.8 km || 
|-id=627 bgcolor=#E9E9E9
| 311627 ||  || — || August 18, 2006 || Anderson Mesa || LONEOS || — || align=right | 2.9 km || 
|-id=628 bgcolor=#E9E9E9
| 311628 ||  || — || August 23, 2006 || Palomar || NEAT || — || align=right | 1.4 km || 
|-id=629 bgcolor=#E9E9E9
| 311629 ||  || — || August 19, 2006 || Kitt Peak || Spacewatch || — || align=right | 1.5 km || 
|-id=630 bgcolor=#E9E9E9
| 311630 ||  || — || August 20, 2006 || Palomar || NEAT || — || align=right | 1.7 km || 
|-id=631 bgcolor=#E9E9E9
| 311631 ||  || — || August 27, 2006 || Anderson Mesa || LONEOS || — || align=right | 3.0 km || 
|-id=632 bgcolor=#fefefe
| 311632 ||  || — || August 16, 2006 || Palomar || NEAT || — || align=right | 1.2 km || 
|-id=633 bgcolor=#E9E9E9
| 311633 ||  || — || August 19, 2006 || Palomar || NEAT || NEM || align=right | 2.4 km || 
|-id=634 bgcolor=#E9E9E9
| 311634 ||  || — || August 20, 2006 || Palomar || NEAT || — || align=right | 2.8 km || 
|-id=635 bgcolor=#d6d6d6
| 311635 ||  || — || August 22, 2006 || Palomar || NEAT || — || align=right | 3.3 km || 
|-id=636 bgcolor=#E9E9E9
| 311636 ||  || — || August 29, 2006 || Anderson Mesa || LONEOS || — || align=right | 2.1 km || 
|-id=637 bgcolor=#E9E9E9
| 311637 ||  || — || August 30, 2006 || Anderson Mesa || LONEOS || — || align=right | 1.5 km || 
|-id=638 bgcolor=#E9E9E9
| 311638 ||  || — || August 30, 2006 || Anderson Mesa || LONEOS || — || align=right | 1.4 km || 
|-id=639 bgcolor=#E9E9E9
| 311639 ||  || — || August 30, 2006 || Anderson Mesa || LONEOS || — || align=right | 1.1 km || 
|-id=640 bgcolor=#E9E9E9
| 311640 ||  || — || August 28, 2006 || Kitt Peak || Spacewatch || — || align=right | 1.5 km || 
|-id=641 bgcolor=#E9E9E9
| 311641 ||  || — || September 11, 2006 || Catalina || CSS || ADE || align=right | 2.1 km || 
|-id=642 bgcolor=#E9E9E9
| 311642 ||  || — || September 14, 2006 || Catalina || CSS || — || align=right | 1.5 km || 
|-id=643 bgcolor=#E9E9E9
| 311643 ||  || — || September 14, 2006 || Catalina || CSS || HNS || align=right | 1.7 km || 
|-id=644 bgcolor=#E9E9E9
| 311644 ||  || — || September 14, 2006 || Kitt Peak || Spacewatch || — || align=right | 1.3 km || 
|-id=645 bgcolor=#E9E9E9
| 311645 ||  || — || September 15, 2006 || Goodricke-Pigott || R. A. Tucker || — || align=right | 3.6 km || 
|-id=646 bgcolor=#E9E9E9
| 311646 ||  || — || September 15, 2006 || Kitt Peak || Spacewatch || — || align=right | 2.5 km || 
|-id=647 bgcolor=#E9E9E9
| 311647 ||  || — || September 15, 2006 || Kitt Peak || Spacewatch || — || align=right | 1.5 km || 
|-id=648 bgcolor=#E9E9E9
| 311648 ||  || — || September 12, 2006 || Catalina || CSS || AEO || align=right | 1.8 km || 
|-id=649 bgcolor=#E9E9E9
| 311649 ||  || — || September 14, 2006 || Catalina || CSS || NEM || align=right | 2.7 km || 
|-id=650 bgcolor=#E9E9E9
| 311650 ||  || — || September 12, 2006 || Catalina || CSS || — || align=right | 2.0 km || 
|-id=651 bgcolor=#E9E9E9
| 311651 ||  || — || September 15, 2006 || Kitt Peak || Spacewatch || MIS || align=right | 2.7 km || 
|-id=652 bgcolor=#E9E9E9
| 311652 ||  || — || September 15, 2006 || Kitt Peak || Spacewatch || — || align=right | 1.5 km || 
|-id=653 bgcolor=#E9E9E9
| 311653 ||  || — || September 15, 2006 || Kitt Peak || Spacewatch || — || align=right | 1.3 km || 
|-id=654 bgcolor=#E9E9E9
| 311654 ||  || — || September 15, 2006 || Kitt Peak || Spacewatch || — || align=right | 2.4 km || 
|-id=655 bgcolor=#E9E9E9
| 311655 ||  || — || September 15, 2006 || Kitt Peak || Spacewatch || — || align=right | 1.6 km || 
|-id=656 bgcolor=#E9E9E9
| 311656 ||  || — || September 15, 2006 || Kitt Peak || Spacewatch || — || align=right | 1.3 km || 
|-id=657 bgcolor=#E9E9E9
| 311657 ||  || — || September 15, 2006 || Kitt Peak || Spacewatch || — || align=right | 3.5 km || 
|-id=658 bgcolor=#E9E9E9
| 311658 ||  || — || September 14, 2006 || Kitt Peak || Spacewatch || — || align=right | 2.3 km || 
|-id=659 bgcolor=#E9E9E9
| 311659 ||  || — || September 16, 2006 || Catalina || CSS || — || align=right | 2.2 km || 
|-id=660 bgcolor=#E9E9E9
| 311660 ||  || — || September 17, 2006 || Kitt Peak || Spacewatch || — || align=right | 1.6 km || 
|-id=661 bgcolor=#E9E9E9
| 311661 ||  || — || September 17, 2006 || Catalina || CSS || — || align=right | 1.5 km || 
|-id=662 bgcolor=#E9E9E9
| 311662 ||  || — || September 17, 2006 || Catalina || CSS || — || align=right | 2.6 km || 
|-id=663 bgcolor=#E9E9E9
| 311663 ||  || — || September 16, 2006 || Catalina || CSS || GEF || align=right | 1.4 km || 
|-id=664 bgcolor=#E9E9E9
| 311664 ||  || — || September 17, 2006 || Kitt Peak || Spacewatch || — || align=right | 1.5 km || 
|-id=665 bgcolor=#E9E9E9
| 311665 ||  || — || September 17, 2006 || Catalina || CSS || — || align=right | 2.5 km || 
|-id=666 bgcolor=#E9E9E9
| 311666 ||  || — || September 17, 2006 || Kitt Peak || Spacewatch || — || align=right | 2.3 km || 
|-id=667 bgcolor=#E9E9E9
| 311667 ||  || — || September 17, 2006 || Anderson Mesa || LONEOS || — || align=right | 2.5 km || 
|-id=668 bgcolor=#E9E9E9
| 311668 ||  || — || September 18, 2006 || Catalina || CSS || — || align=right | 2.0 km || 
|-id=669 bgcolor=#E9E9E9
| 311669 ||  || — || September 18, 2006 || Catalina || CSS || MIS || align=right | 2.8 km || 
|-id=670 bgcolor=#E9E9E9
| 311670 ||  || — || September 19, 2006 || Anderson Mesa || LONEOS || — || align=right | 2.0 km || 
|-id=671 bgcolor=#E9E9E9
| 311671 ||  || — || September 19, 2006 || Kitt Peak || Spacewatch || — || align=right | 1.3 km || 
|-id=672 bgcolor=#E9E9E9
| 311672 ||  || — || September 17, 2006 || Anderson Mesa || LONEOS || — || align=right | 1.8 km || 
|-id=673 bgcolor=#E9E9E9
| 311673 ||  || — || September 16, 2006 || Catalina || CSS || JUN || align=right | 1.4 km || 
|-id=674 bgcolor=#E9E9E9
| 311674 ||  || — || September 20, 2006 || Catalina || CSS || — || align=right | 3.0 km || 
|-id=675 bgcolor=#E9E9E9
| 311675 ||  || — || September 18, 2006 || Catalina || CSS || MAR || align=right | 1.8 km || 
|-id=676 bgcolor=#E9E9E9
| 311676 ||  || — || September 18, 2006 || Catalina || CSS || HNS || align=right | 1.5 km || 
|-id=677 bgcolor=#E9E9E9
| 311677 ||  || — || September 17, 2006 || Kitt Peak || Spacewatch || DOR || align=right | 2.5 km || 
|-id=678 bgcolor=#E9E9E9
| 311678 ||  || — || September 19, 2006 || Kitt Peak || Spacewatch || — || align=right | 1.5 km || 
|-id=679 bgcolor=#E9E9E9
| 311679 ||  || — || September 19, 2006 || Kitt Peak || Spacewatch || AST || align=right | 1.6 km || 
|-id=680 bgcolor=#E9E9E9
| 311680 ||  || — || September 19, 2006 || Kitt Peak || Spacewatch || — || align=right | 2.2 km || 
|-id=681 bgcolor=#E9E9E9
| 311681 ||  || — || September 17, 2006 || Kitt Peak || Spacewatch || — || align=right | 2.5 km || 
|-id=682 bgcolor=#E9E9E9
| 311682 ||  || — || September 17, 2006 || Catalina || CSS || MAR || align=right | 1.7 km || 
|-id=683 bgcolor=#E9E9E9
| 311683 ||  || — || September 18, 2006 || Kitt Peak || Spacewatch || — || align=right | 3.1 km || 
|-id=684 bgcolor=#E9E9E9
| 311684 ||  || — || September 18, 2006 || Kitt Peak || Spacewatch || — || align=right | 2.0 km || 
|-id=685 bgcolor=#E9E9E9
| 311685 ||  || — || September 18, 2006 || Kitt Peak || Spacewatch || AST || align=right | 2.6 km || 
|-id=686 bgcolor=#E9E9E9
| 311686 ||  || — || September 18, 2006 || Kitt Peak || Spacewatch || — || align=right | 1.5 km || 
|-id=687 bgcolor=#E9E9E9
| 311687 ||  || — || September 19, 2006 || Kitt Peak || Spacewatch || HNA || align=right | 1.6 km || 
|-id=688 bgcolor=#E9E9E9
| 311688 ||  || — || September 23, 2006 || Kitt Peak || Spacewatch || — || align=right | 1.8 km || 
|-id=689 bgcolor=#E9E9E9
| 311689 ||  || — || September 24, 2006 || Kitt Peak || Spacewatch || — || align=right | 1.7 km || 
|-id=690 bgcolor=#E9E9E9
| 311690 ||  || — || September 18, 2006 || Catalina || CSS || AEO || align=right | 1.7 km || 
|-id=691 bgcolor=#E9E9E9
| 311691 ||  || — || September 18, 2006 || Catalina || CSS || — || align=right | 3.8 km || 
|-id=692 bgcolor=#E9E9E9
| 311692 ||  || — || September 18, 2006 || Catalina || CSS || — || align=right | 2.5 km || 
|-id=693 bgcolor=#E9E9E9
| 311693 ||  || — || September 18, 2006 || Catalina || CSS || — || align=right | 2.3 km || 
|-id=694 bgcolor=#E9E9E9
| 311694 ||  || — || September 19, 2006 || Catalina || CSS || EUN || align=right | 1.7 km || 
|-id=695 bgcolor=#E9E9E9
| 311695 ||  || — || September 20, 2006 || Anderson Mesa || LONEOS || — || align=right | 2.9 km || 
|-id=696 bgcolor=#E9E9E9
| 311696 ||  || — || September 25, 2006 || Anderson Mesa || LONEOS || — || align=right | 2.2 km || 
|-id=697 bgcolor=#E9E9E9
| 311697 ||  || — || September 19, 2006 || Kitt Peak || Spacewatch || — || align=right | 1.0 km || 
|-id=698 bgcolor=#E9E9E9
| 311698 ||  || — || September 19, 2006 || Kitt Peak || Spacewatch || DOR || align=right | 2.4 km || 
|-id=699 bgcolor=#E9E9E9
| 311699 ||  || — || September 19, 2006 || Kitt Peak || Spacewatch || — || align=right | 1.9 km || 
|-id=700 bgcolor=#E9E9E9
| 311700 ||  || — || September 19, 2006 || Kitt Peak || Spacewatch || — || align=right | 2.6 km || 
|}

311701–311800 

|-bgcolor=#E9E9E9
| 311701 ||  || — || September 23, 2006 || Kitt Peak || Spacewatch || — || align=right | 1.1 km || 
|-id=702 bgcolor=#E9E9E9
| 311702 ||  || — || September 26, 2006 || Kitt Peak || Spacewatch || — || align=right | 1.7 km || 
|-id=703 bgcolor=#E9E9E9
| 311703 ||  || — || September 26, 2006 || Mount Lemmon || Mount Lemmon Survey || — || align=right | 1.6 km || 
|-id=704 bgcolor=#E9E9E9
| 311704 ||  || — || September 26, 2006 || Catalina || CSS || — || align=right | 1.6 km || 
|-id=705 bgcolor=#E9E9E9
| 311705 ||  || — || September 27, 2006 || Črni Vrh || Črni Vrh || GER || align=right | 1.7 km || 
|-id=706 bgcolor=#E9E9E9
| 311706 ||  || — || September 25, 2006 || Mount Lemmon || Mount Lemmon Survey || — || align=right | 1.9 km || 
|-id=707 bgcolor=#E9E9E9
| 311707 ||  || — || September 26, 2006 || Kitt Peak || Spacewatch || — || align=right | 2.0 km || 
|-id=708 bgcolor=#E9E9E9
| 311708 ||  || — || September 27, 2006 || Kitt Peak || Spacewatch || — || align=right | 1.7 km || 
|-id=709 bgcolor=#E9E9E9
| 311709 ||  || — || September 22, 2006 || Anderson Mesa || LONEOS || JUN || align=right | 1.4 km || 
|-id=710 bgcolor=#E9E9E9
| 311710 ||  || — || September 25, 2006 || Kitt Peak || Spacewatch || — || align=right | 1.7 km || 
|-id=711 bgcolor=#E9E9E9
| 311711 ||  || — || September 27, 2006 || Kitt Peak || Spacewatch || AST || align=right | 1.7 km || 
|-id=712 bgcolor=#E9E9E9
| 311712 ||  || — || September 28, 2006 || Mount Lemmon || Mount Lemmon Survey || WIT || align=right | 1.2 km || 
|-id=713 bgcolor=#E9E9E9
| 311713 ||  || — || September 28, 2006 || Kitt Peak || Spacewatch || — || align=right | 1.4 km || 
|-id=714 bgcolor=#E9E9E9
| 311714 ||  || — || September 30, 2006 || Catalina || CSS || — || align=right | 1.7 km || 
|-id=715 bgcolor=#E9E9E9
| 311715 ||  || — || September 30, 2006 || Catalina || CSS || — || align=right | 2.6 km || 
|-id=716 bgcolor=#E9E9E9
| 311716 ||  || — || September 30, 2006 || Catalina || CSS || MRX || align=right | 1.2 km || 
|-id=717 bgcolor=#E9E9E9
| 311717 ||  || — || September 30, 2006 || Catalina || CSS || — || align=right | 2.4 km || 
|-id=718 bgcolor=#E9E9E9
| 311718 ||  || — || September 30, 2006 || Catalina || CSS || — || align=right | 3.0 km || 
|-id=719 bgcolor=#E9E9E9
| 311719 ||  || — || September 30, 2006 || Catalina || CSS || — || align=right | 2.2 km || 
|-id=720 bgcolor=#E9E9E9
| 311720 ||  || — || September 27, 2006 || Kitt Peak || Spacewatch || — || align=right | 1.5 km || 
|-id=721 bgcolor=#E9E9E9
| 311721 ||  || — || September 27, 2006 || Catalina || CSS || — || align=right | 2.6 km || 
|-id=722 bgcolor=#E9E9E9
| 311722 ||  || — || September 25, 2006 || Kitt Peak || Spacewatch || — || align=right | 2.2 km || 
|-id=723 bgcolor=#E9E9E9
| 311723 ||  || — || September 16, 2006 || Apache Point || A. C. Becker || WIT || align=right | 1.1 km || 
|-id=724 bgcolor=#E9E9E9
| 311724 ||  || — || September 17, 2006 || Apache Point || A. C. Becker || — || align=right | 2.8 km || 
|-id=725 bgcolor=#E9E9E9
| 311725 ||  || — || September 18, 2006 || Apache Point || A. C. Becker || — || align=right | 1.8 km || 
|-id=726 bgcolor=#E9E9E9
| 311726 ||  || — || September 18, 2006 || Apache Point || A. C. Becker || — || align=right | 2.2 km || 
|-id=727 bgcolor=#E9E9E9
| 311727 ||  || — || September 27, 2006 || Apache Point || A. C. Becker || — || align=right | 2.8 km || 
|-id=728 bgcolor=#E9E9E9
| 311728 ||  || — || September 28, 2006 || Apache Point || A. C. Becker || — || align=right | 2.2 km || 
|-id=729 bgcolor=#E9E9E9
| 311729 ||  || — || September 17, 2006 || Kitt Peak || Spacewatch || — || align=right | 2.2 km || 
|-id=730 bgcolor=#E9E9E9
| 311730 ||  || — || September 27, 2006 || Mount Lemmon || Mount Lemmon Survey || — || align=right | 2.7 km || 
|-id=731 bgcolor=#E9E9E9
| 311731 ||  || — || September 30, 2006 || Mount Lemmon || Mount Lemmon Survey || — || align=right | 1.6 km || 
|-id=732 bgcolor=#E9E9E9
| 311732 ||  || — || September 17, 2006 || Kitt Peak || Spacewatch || — || align=right data-sort-value="0.96" | 960 m || 
|-id=733 bgcolor=#E9E9E9
| 311733 ||  || — || September 26, 2006 || Mount Lemmon || Mount Lemmon Survey || — || align=right | 1.7 km || 
|-id=734 bgcolor=#E9E9E9
| 311734 ||  || — || September 27, 2006 || Mount Lemmon || Mount Lemmon Survey || — || align=right | 2.4 km || 
|-id=735 bgcolor=#E9E9E9
| 311735 ||  || — || September 30, 2006 || Mount Lemmon || Mount Lemmon Survey || — || align=right | 1.6 km || 
|-id=736 bgcolor=#E9E9E9
| 311736 ||  || — || September 17, 2006 || Catalina || CSS || MAR || align=right | 1.3 km || 
|-id=737 bgcolor=#E9E9E9
| 311737 ||  || — || September 24, 2006 || Anderson Mesa || LONEOS || — || align=right | 4.8 km || 
|-id=738 bgcolor=#E9E9E9
| 311738 ||  || — || September 19, 2006 || Catalina || CSS || — || align=right | 2.9 km || 
|-id=739 bgcolor=#E9E9E9
| 311739 ||  || — || October 2, 2006 || Mount Lemmon || Mount Lemmon Survey || — || align=right | 1.1 km || 
|-id=740 bgcolor=#E9E9E9
| 311740 ||  || — || October 4, 2006 || Mount Lemmon || Mount Lemmon Survey || — || align=right | 1.4 km || 
|-id=741 bgcolor=#E9E9E9
| 311741 ||  || — || October 11, 2006 || Kitt Peak || Spacewatch || — || align=right | 2.5 km || 
|-id=742 bgcolor=#E9E9E9
| 311742 ||  || — || October 11, 2006 || Kitt Peak || Spacewatch || — || align=right | 2.3 km || 
|-id=743 bgcolor=#E9E9E9
| 311743 ||  || — || October 11, 2006 || Kitt Peak || Spacewatch || — || align=right | 3.1 km || 
|-id=744 bgcolor=#E9E9E9
| 311744 ||  || — || October 11, 2006 || Kitt Peak || Spacewatch || — || align=right | 2.3 km || 
|-id=745 bgcolor=#E9E9E9
| 311745 ||  || — || October 12, 2006 || Kitt Peak || Spacewatch || AGN || align=right | 1.2 km || 
|-id=746 bgcolor=#E9E9E9
| 311746 ||  || — || October 12, 2006 || Kitt Peak || Spacewatch || ADE || align=right | 3.7 km || 
|-id=747 bgcolor=#E9E9E9
| 311747 ||  || — || October 12, 2006 || Kitt Peak || Spacewatch || — || align=right | 2.6 km || 
|-id=748 bgcolor=#E9E9E9
| 311748 ||  || — || October 12, 2006 || Palomar || NEAT || — || align=right | 2.3 km || 
|-id=749 bgcolor=#E9E9E9
| 311749 ||  || — || October 12, 2006 || Kitt Peak || Spacewatch || — || align=right | 1.6 km || 
|-id=750 bgcolor=#E9E9E9
| 311750 ||  || — || October 13, 2006 || Kitt Peak || Spacewatch || WIT || align=right data-sort-value="0.93" | 930 m || 
|-id=751 bgcolor=#E9E9E9
| 311751 ||  || — || October 11, 2006 || Palomar || NEAT || — || align=right | 2.0 km || 
|-id=752 bgcolor=#E9E9E9
| 311752 ||  || — || October 11, 2006 || Palomar || NEAT || — || align=right | 3.2 km || 
|-id=753 bgcolor=#E9E9E9
| 311753 ||  || — || October 11, 2006 || Palomar || NEAT || — || align=right | 1.7 km || 
|-id=754 bgcolor=#E9E9E9
| 311754 ||  || — || October 11, 2006 || Palomar || NEAT || CLO || align=right | 3.1 km || 
|-id=755 bgcolor=#E9E9E9
| 311755 ||  || — || October 2, 2006 || Mount Lemmon || Mount Lemmon Survey || — || align=right | 1.8 km || 
|-id=756 bgcolor=#E9E9E9
| 311756 ||  || — || October 13, 2006 || Kitt Peak || Spacewatch || — || align=right | 3.1 km || 
|-id=757 bgcolor=#E9E9E9
| 311757 ||  || — || October 13, 2006 || Kitt Peak || Spacewatch || GEF || align=right | 1.7 km || 
|-id=758 bgcolor=#E9E9E9
| 311758 ||  || — || October 15, 2006 || Kitt Peak || Spacewatch || — || align=right | 2.4 km || 
|-id=759 bgcolor=#E9E9E9
| 311759 ||  || — || October 15, 2006 || Lulin Observatory || C.-S. Lin, Q.-z. Ye || — || align=right | 2.2 km || 
|-id=760 bgcolor=#E9E9E9
| 311760 ||  || — || October 12, 2006 || Palomar || NEAT || ADE || align=right | 3.1 km || 
|-id=761 bgcolor=#E9E9E9
| 311761 ||  || — || September 24, 2006 || Kitt Peak || Spacewatch || — || align=right | 1.9 km || 
|-id=762 bgcolor=#E9E9E9
| 311762 ||  || — || October 15, 2006 || Kitt Peak || Spacewatch || NEM || align=right | 2.5 km || 
|-id=763 bgcolor=#E9E9E9
| 311763 ||  || — || October 15, 2006 || Kitt Peak || Spacewatch || — || align=right | 2.2 km || 
|-id=764 bgcolor=#E9E9E9
| 311764 ||  || — || October 12, 2006 || Kitt Peak || Spacewatch || AGN || align=right | 1.3 km || 
|-id=765 bgcolor=#E9E9E9
| 311765 ||  || — || October 1, 2006 || Apache Point || A. C. Becker || — || align=right | 2.5 km || 
|-id=766 bgcolor=#E9E9E9
| 311766 ||  || — || October 12, 2006 || Palomar || NEAT || — || align=right | 2.0 km || 
|-id=767 bgcolor=#E9E9E9
| 311767 ||  || — || October 12, 2006 || Kitt Peak || Spacewatch || — || align=right | 1.9 km || 
|-id=768 bgcolor=#E9E9E9
| 311768 ||  || — || October 12, 2006 || Kitt Peak || Spacewatch || — || align=right | 1.6 km || 
|-id=769 bgcolor=#E9E9E9
| 311769 ||  || — || October 4, 2006 || Mount Lemmon || Mount Lemmon Survey || — || align=right | 1.8 km || 
|-id=770 bgcolor=#E9E9E9
| 311770 ||  || — || October 16, 2006 || Catalina || CSS || NEM || align=right | 3.3 km || 
|-id=771 bgcolor=#E9E9E9
| 311771 ||  || — || October 16, 2006 || Catalina || CSS || — || align=right | 3.1 km || 
|-id=772 bgcolor=#E9E9E9
| 311772 ||  || — || October 16, 2006 || Kitt Peak || Spacewatch || HEN || align=right | 1.1 km || 
|-id=773 bgcolor=#E9E9E9
| 311773 ||  || — || October 16, 2006 || Catalina || CSS || NEM || align=right | 2.4 km || 
|-id=774 bgcolor=#E9E9E9
| 311774 ||  || — || October 16, 2006 || Catalina || CSS || — || align=right | 1.9 km || 
|-id=775 bgcolor=#E9E9E9
| 311775 ||  || — || October 16, 2006 || Mount Lemmon || Mount Lemmon Survey || — || align=right data-sort-value="0.89" | 890 m || 
|-id=776 bgcolor=#E9E9E9
| 311776 ||  || — || October 16, 2006 || Kitt Peak || Spacewatch || MRX || align=right | 1.0 km || 
|-id=777 bgcolor=#E9E9E9
| 311777 ||  || — || October 16, 2006 || Kitt Peak || Spacewatch || HOF || align=right | 2.5 km || 
|-id=778 bgcolor=#E9E9E9
| 311778 ||  || — || October 16, 2006 || Kitt Peak || Spacewatch || AGN || align=right | 1.5 km || 
|-id=779 bgcolor=#E9E9E9
| 311779 ||  || — || October 16, 2006 || Kitt Peak || Spacewatch || — || align=right | 3.1 km || 
|-id=780 bgcolor=#E9E9E9
| 311780 ||  || — || October 16, 2006 || Kitt Peak || Spacewatch || — || align=right | 2.5 km || 
|-id=781 bgcolor=#E9E9E9
| 311781 ||  || — || October 17, 2006 || Mount Lemmon || Mount Lemmon Survey || — || align=right | 1.4 km || 
|-id=782 bgcolor=#E9E9E9
| 311782 ||  || — || October 17, 2006 || Catalina || CSS || AEO || align=right | 1.1 km || 
|-id=783 bgcolor=#d6d6d6
| 311783 ||  || — || October 19, 2006 || Catalina || CSS || — || align=right | 4.1 km || 
|-id=784 bgcolor=#E9E9E9
| 311784 ||  || — || October 17, 2006 || Andrushivka || Andrushivka Obs. || — || align=right | 2.7 km || 
|-id=785 bgcolor=#E9E9E9
| 311785 Erwanmazarico ||  ||  || October 19, 2006 || CBA-NOVAC || D. R. Skillman || — || align=right | 2.5 km || 
|-id=786 bgcolor=#E9E9E9
| 311786 ||  || — || October 17, 2006 || Andrushivka || Andrushivka Obs. || DOR || align=right | 2.6 km || 
|-id=787 bgcolor=#E9E9E9
| 311787 ||  || — || October 16, 2006 || Kitt Peak || Spacewatch || — || align=right | 2.5 km || 
|-id=788 bgcolor=#E9E9E9
| 311788 ||  || — || October 16, 2006 || Mount Lemmon || Mount Lemmon Survey || — || align=right | 1.5 km || 
|-id=789 bgcolor=#E9E9E9
| 311789 ||  || — || October 17, 2006 || Kitt Peak || Spacewatch || — || align=right | 2.0 km || 
|-id=790 bgcolor=#E9E9E9
| 311790 ||  || — || October 17, 2006 || Kitt Peak || Spacewatch || — || align=right | 1.4 km || 
|-id=791 bgcolor=#E9E9E9
| 311791 ||  || — || October 17, 2006 || Kitt Peak || Spacewatch || — || align=right | 2.0 km || 
|-id=792 bgcolor=#E9E9E9
| 311792 ||  || — || October 17, 2006 || Kitt Peak || Spacewatch || — || align=right | 2.2 km || 
|-id=793 bgcolor=#E9E9E9
| 311793 ||  || — || October 17, 2006 || Kitt Peak || Spacewatch || WIT || align=right | 1.2 km || 
|-id=794 bgcolor=#E9E9E9
| 311794 ||  || — || October 17, 2006 || Mount Lemmon || Mount Lemmon Survey || AGN || align=right | 1.2 km || 
|-id=795 bgcolor=#E9E9E9
| 311795 ||  || — || October 17, 2006 || Mount Lemmon || Mount Lemmon Survey || AGN || align=right | 1.3 km || 
|-id=796 bgcolor=#E9E9E9
| 311796 ||  || — || October 18, 2006 || Kitt Peak || Spacewatch || — || align=right | 2.2 km || 
|-id=797 bgcolor=#E9E9E9
| 311797 ||  || — || October 18, 2006 || Kitt Peak || Spacewatch || — || align=right | 2.0 km || 
|-id=798 bgcolor=#E9E9E9
| 311798 ||  || — || October 19, 2006 || Kitt Peak || Spacewatch || — || align=right | 2.2 km || 
|-id=799 bgcolor=#E9E9E9
| 311799 ||  || — || October 19, 2006 || Catalina || CSS || — || align=right | 2.2 km || 
|-id=800 bgcolor=#E9E9E9
| 311800 ||  || — || October 19, 2006 || Kitt Peak || Spacewatch || HOF || align=right | 2.4 km || 
|}

311801–311900 

|-bgcolor=#E9E9E9
| 311801 ||  || — || October 19, 2006 || Catalina || CSS || 526 || align=right | 3.2 km || 
|-id=802 bgcolor=#E9E9E9
| 311802 ||  || — || October 19, 2006 || Kitt Peak || Spacewatch || — || align=right | 2.1 km || 
|-id=803 bgcolor=#E9E9E9
| 311803 ||  || — || October 19, 2006 || Kitt Peak || Spacewatch || — || align=right | 3.1 km || 
|-id=804 bgcolor=#E9E9E9
| 311804 ||  || — || October 19, 2006 || Kitt Peak || Spacewatch || AGN || align=right | 1.5 km || 
|-id=805 bgcolor=#E9E9E9
| 311805 ||  || — || October 20, 2006 || Kitt Peak || Spacewatch || — || align=right | 1.9 km || 
|-id=806 bgcolor=#E9E9E9
| 311806 ||  || — || October 21, 2006 || Mount Lemmon || Mount Lemmon Survey || — || align=right | 1.5 km || 
|-id=807 bgcolor=#E9E9E9
| 311807 ||  || — || October 16, 2006 || Catalina || CSS || — || align=right | 2.2 km || 
|-id=808 bgcolor=#E9E9E9
| 311808 ||  || — || October 16, 2006 || Catalina || CSS || — || align=right | 2.0 km || 
|-id=809 bgcolor=#E9E9E9
| 311809 ||  || — || October 19, 2006 || Catalina || CSS || — || align=right | 1.5 km || 
|-id=810 bgcolor=#E9E9E9
| 311810 ||  || — || October 20, 2006 || Kitt Peak || Spacewatch || — || align=right | 2.2 km || 
|-id=811 bgcolor=#E9E9E9
| 311811 ||  || — || October 20, 2006 || Kitt Peak || Spacewatch || — || align=right | 2.9 km || 
|-id=812 bgcolor=#d6d6d6
| 311812 ||  || — || October 22, 2006 || Palomar || NEAT || ALA || align=right | 4.0 km || 
|-id=813 bgcolor=#E9E9E9
| 311813 ||  || — || October 23, 2006 || Kitt Peak || Spacewatch || — || align=right | 2.9 km || 
|-id=814 bgcolor=#E9E9E9
| 311814 ||  || — || October 23, 2006 || Kitt Peak || Spacewatch || — || align=right | 3.2 km || 
|-id=815 bgcolor=#E9E9E9
| 311815 ||  || — || October 23, 2006 || Kitt Peak || Spacewatch || — || align=right | 3.4 km || 
|-id=816 bgcolor=#E9E9E9
| 311816 ||  || — || October 23, 2006 || Kitt Peak || Spacewatch || — || align=right | 1.8 km || 
|-id=817 bgcolor=#E9E9E9
| 311817 ||  || — || October 23, 2006 || Kitt Peak || Spacewatch || — || align=right | 2.3 km || 
|-id=818 bgcolor=#E9E9E9
| 311818 ||  || — || October 16, 2006 || Catalina || CSS || — || align=right | 2.7 km || 
|-id=819 bgcolor=#E9E9E9
| 311819 ||  || — || October 27, 2006 || Mount Lemmon || Mount Lemmon Survey || — || align=right | 3.3 km || 
|-id=820 bgcolor=#E9E9E9
| 311820 ||  || — || October 27, 2006 || Mount Lemmon || Mount Lemmon Survey || AGN || align=right | 1.3 km || 
|-id=821 bgcolor=#E9E9E9
| 311821 ||  || — || October 27, 2006 || Kitt Peak || Spacewatch || — || align=right | 2.2 km || 
|-id=822 bgcolor=#E9E9E9
| 311822 ||  || — || October 27, 2006 || Catalina || CSS || INO || align=right | 1.8 km || 
|-id=823 bgcolor=#E9E9E9
| 311823 ||  || — || October 27, 2006 || Kitt Peak || Spacewatch || NEM || align=right | 3.0 km || 
|-id=824 bgcolor=#E9E9E9
| 311824 ||  || — || October 28, 2006 || Kitt Peak || Spacewatch || — || align=right | 1.5 km || 
|-id=825 bgcolor=#E9E9E9
| 311825 ||  || — || October 28, 2006 || Kitt Peak || Spacewatch || — || align=right | 2.9 km || 
|-id=826 bgcolor=#E9E9E9
| 311826 ||  || — || October 21, 2006 || Apache Point || A. C. Becker || — || align=right | 1.6 km || 
|-id=827 bgcolor=#d6d6d6
| 311827 ||  || — || October 22, 2006 || Mount Lemmon || Mount Lemmon Survey || — || align=right | 4.4 km || 
|-id=828 bgcolor=#E9E9E9
| 311828 ||  || — || October 23, 2006 || Catalina || CSS || — || align=right | 2.7 km || 
|-id=829 bgcolor=#E9E9E9
| 311829 ||  || — || November 9, 2006 || Kitt Peak || Spacewatch || WIT || align=right | 1.1 km || 
|-id=830 bgcolor=#E9E9E9
| 311830 ||  || — || November 11, 2006 || Catalina || CSS || AGN || align=right | 1.5 km || 
|-id=831 bgcolor=#E9E9E9
| 311831 ||  || — || November 13, 2006 || Wrightwood || J. W. Young || AGN || align=right | 1.2 km || 
|-id=832 bgcolor=#E9E9E9
| 311832 ||  || — || November 9, 2006 || Kitt Peak || Spacewatch || — || align=right | 2.5 km || 
|-id=833 bgcolor=#d6d6d6
| 311833 ||  || — || November 9, 2006 || Kitt Peak || Spacewatch || KOR || align=right | 1.3 km || 
|-id=834 bgcolor=#d6d6d6
| 311834 ||  || — || November 10, 2006 || Kitt Peak || Spacewatch || KOR || align=right | 1.3 km || 
|-id=835 bgcolor=#d6d6d6
| 311835 ||  || — || October 27, 2006 || Kitt Peak || Spacewatch || — || align=right | 2.9 km || 
|-id=836 bgcolor=#E9E9E9
| 311836 ||  || — || November 10, 2006 || Kitt Peak || Spacewatch || — || align=right | 1.8 km || 
|-id=837 bgcolor=#E9E9E9
| 311837 ||  || — || November 13, 2006 || Catalina || CSS || — || align=right | 3.1 km || 
|-id=838 bgcolor=#E9E9E9
| 311838 ||  || — || November 10, 2006 || Kitt Peak || Spacewatch || — || align=right | 1.7 km || 
|-id=839 bgcolor=#E9E9E9
| 311839 ||  || — || November 11, 2006 || Kitt Peak || Spacewatch || — || align=right | 3.6 km || 
|-id=840 bgcolor=#E9E9E9
| 311840 ||  || — || November 11, 2006 || Kitt Peak || Spacewatch || — || align=right | 2.6 km || 
|-id=841 bgcolor=#E9E9E9
| 311841 ||  || — || November 11, 2006 || Kitt Peak || Spacewatch || NEM || align=right | 2.8 km || 
|-id=842 bgcolor=#E9E9E9
| 311842 ||  || — || November 11, 2006 || Catalina || CSS || CLO || align=right | 2.4 km || 
|-id=843 bgcolor=#E9E9E9
| 311843 ||  || — || November 11, 2006 || Kitt Peak || Spacewatch || — || align=right | 3.3 km || 
|-id=844 bgcolor=#E9E9E9
| 311844 ||  || — || November 11, 2006 || Kitt Peak || Spacewatch || INO || align=right | 1.5 km || 
|-id=845 bgcolor=#E9E9E9
| 311845 ||  || — || November 12, 2006 || Mount Lemmon || Mount Lemmon Survey || PAD || align=right | 2.0 km || 
|-id=846 bgcolor=#E9E9E9
| 311846 ||  || — || November 13, 2006 || Kitt Peak || Spacewatch || HOF || align=right | 2.5 km || 
|-id=847 bgcolor=#fefefe
| 311847 ||  || — || November 15, 2006 || Mount Lemmon || Mount Lemmon Survey || H || align=right data-sort-value="0.90" | 900 m || 
|-id=848 bgcolor=#E9E9E9
| 311848 ||  || — || November 13, 2006 || Mount Lemmon || Mount Lemmon Survey || HOF || align=right | 2.6 km || 
|-id=849 bgcolor=#E9E9E9
| 311849 ||  || — || November 12, 2006 || Mount Lemmon || Mount Lemmon Survey || MRX || align=right | 1.2 km || 
|-id=850 bgcolor=#E9E9E9
| 311850 ||  || — || November 13, 2006 || Kitt Peak || Spacewatch || — || align=right | 2.0 km || 
|-id=851 bgcolor=#E9E9E9
| 311851 ||  || — || November 15, 2006 || Kitt Peak || Spacewatch || AGN || align=right | 1.4 km || 
|-id=852 bgcolor=#d6d6d6
| 311852 ||  || — || November 9, 2006 || Palomar || NEAT || — || align=right | 3.9 km || 
|-id=853 bgcolor=#E9E9E9
| 311853 ||  || — || November 8, 2006 || Palomar || NEAT || — || align=right | 4.1 km || 
|-id=854 bgcolor=#E9E9E9
| 311854 ||  || — || November 8, 2006 || Palomar || NEAT || NEM || align=right | 2.7 km || 
|-id=855 bgcolor=#d6d6d6
| 311855 ||  || — || November 16, 2006 || Kitt Peak || Spacewatch || CHA || align=right | 2.3 km || 
|-id=856 bgcolor=#E9E9E9
| 311856 ||  || — || November 16, 2006 || Kitt Peak || Spacewatch || WIT || align=right | 1.1 km || 
|-id=857 bgcolor=#E9E9E9
| 311857 ||  || — || November 16, 2006 || Catalina || CSS || — || align=right | 3.0 km || 
|-id=858 bgcolor=#E9E9E9
| 311858 ||  || — || November 17, 2006 || Catalina || CSS || AGN || align=right | 1.3 km || 
|-id=859 bgcolor=#E9E9E9
| 311859 ||  || — || November 17, 2006 || Mount Lemmon || Mount Lemmon Survey || AEO || align=right | 1.3 km || 
|-id=860 bgcolor=#E9E9E9
| 311860 ||  || — || November 18, 2006 || Kitt Peak || Spacewatch || — || align=right | 3.2 km || 
|-id=861 bgcolor=#E9E9E9
| 311861 ||  || — || November 20, 2006 || Kitt Peak || Spacewatch || HEN || align=right data-sort-value="0.91" | 910 m || 
|-id=862 bgcolor=#d6d6d6
| 311862 ||  || — || November 16, 2006 || Kitt Peak || Spacewatch || — || align=right | 2.7 km || 
|-id=863 bgcolor=#d6d6d6
| 311863 ||  || — || November 16, 2006 || Kitt Peak || Spacewatch || KOR || align=right | 1.5 km || 
|-id=864 bgcolor=#E9E9E9
| 311864 ||  || — || November 16, 2006 || Catalina || CSS || AST || align=right | 1.7 km || 
|-id=865 bgcolor=#E9E9E9
| 311865 ||  || — || November 18, 2006 || Kitt Peak || Spacewatch || MRX || align=right | 1.2 km || 
|-id=866 bgcolor=#E9E9E9
| 311866 ||  || — || November 18, 2006 || Kitt Peak || Spacewatch || — || align=right | 1.5 km || 
|-id=867 bgcolor=#E9E9E9
| 311867 ||  || — || November 18, 2006 || Kitt Peak || Spacewatch || PAD || align=right | 1.6 km || 
|-id=868 bgcolor=#d6d6d6
| 311868 ||  || — || November 18, 2006 || Kitt Peak || Spacewatch || — || align=right | 2.7 km || 
|-id=869 bgcolor=#E9E9E9
| 311869 ||  || — || November 19, 2006 || Kitt Peak || Spacewatch || ADE || align=right | 2.3 km || 
|-id=870 bgcolor=#E9E9E9
| 311870 ||  || — || November 19, 2006 || Kitt Peak || Spacewatch || CLO || align=right | 3.1 km || 
|-id=871 bgcolor=#E9E9E9
| 311871 ||  || — || November 19, 2006 || Kitt Peak || Spacewatch || PAD || align=right | 2.0 km || 
|-id=872 bgcolor=#E9E9E9
| 311872 ||  || — || November 19, 2006 || Kitt Peak || Spacewatch || — || align=right | 2.5 km || 
|-id=873 bgcolor=#d6d6d6
| 311873 ||  || — || November 19, 2006 || Kitt Peak || Spacewatch || — || align=right | 3.0 km || 
|-id=874 bgcolor=#d6d6d6
| 311874 ||  || — || November 19, 2006 || Kitt Peak || Spacewatch || KOR || align=right | 1.3 km || 
|-id=875 bgcolor=#E9E9E9
| 311875 ||  || — || November 17, 2006 || Mount Lemmon || Mount Lemmon Survey || — || align=right | 2.6 km || 
|-id=876 bgcolor=#E9E9E9
| 311876 ||  || — || November 18, 2006 || Socorro || LINEAR || — || align=right | 3.3 km || 
|-id=877 bgcolor=#E9E9E9
| 311877 ||  || — || November 19, 2006 || Catalina || CSS || — || align=right | 2.8 km || 
|-id=878 bgcolor=#E9E9E9
| 311878 ||  || — || November 20, 2006 || Kitt Peak || Spacewatch || HEN || align=right | 1.3 km || 
|-id=879 bgcolor=#E9E9E9
| 311879 ||  || — || November 20, 2006 || Mount Lemmon || Mount Lemmon Survey || — || align=right | 4.2 km || 
|-id=880 bgcolor=#E9E9E9
| 311880 ||  || — || November 21, 2006 || Mount Lemmon || Mount Lemmon Survey || — || align=right | 2.9 km || 
|-id=881 bgcolor=#fefefe
| 311881 ||  || — || November 18, 2006 || Socorro || LINEAR || H || align=right data-sort-value="0.96" | 960 m || 
|-id=882 bgcolor=#d6d6d6
| 311882 ||  || — || November 27, 2006 || Kitt Peak || Spacewatch || KOR || align=right | 1.5 km || 
|-id=883 bgcolor=#d6d6d6
| 311883 ||  || — || November 23, 2006 || Mount Lemmon || Mount Lemmon Survey || — || align=right | 4.1 km || 
|-id=884 bgcolor=#d6d6d6
| 311884 ||  || — || November 22, 2006 || Mount Lemmon || Mount Lemmon Survey || — || align=right | 4.2 km || 
|-id=885 bgcolor=#d6d6d6
| 311885 ||  || — || December 10, 2006 || Kitt Peak || Spacewatch || EOS || align=right | 4.6 km || 
|-id=886 bgcolor=#d6d6d6
| 311886 ||  || — || December 12, 2006 || Kitt Peak || Spacewatch || — || align=right | 3.7 km || 
|-id=887 bgcolor=#E9E9E9
| 311887 ||  || — || December 11, 2006 || Kitt Peak || Spacewatch || — || align=right | 2.3 km || 
|-id=888 bgcolor=#E9E9E9
| 311888 ||  || — || December 11, 2006 || Kitt Peak || Spacewatch || — || align=right | 3.6 km || 
|-id=889 bgcolor=#d6d6d6
| 311889 ||  || — || December 11, 2006 || Kitt Peak || Spacewatch || — || align=right | 3.6 km || 
|-id=890 bgcolor=#d6d6d6
| 311890 ||  || — || December 12, 2006 || Mount Lemmon || Mount Lemmon Survey || EOS || align=right | 2.5 km || 
|-id=891 bgcolor=#d6d6d6
| 311891 ||  || — || December 13, 2006 || Mount Lemmon || Mount Lemmon Survey || — || align=right | 4.1 km || 
|-id=892 bgcolor=#d6d6d6
| 311892 ||  || — || December 15, 2006 || Socorro || LINEAR || — || align=right | 4.0 km || 
|-id=893 bgcolor=#d6d6d6
| 311893 ||  || — || December 14, 2006 || Kitt Peak || Spacewatch || — || align=right | 4.3 km || 
|-id=894 bgcolor=#d6d6d6
| 311894 ||  || — || December 15, 2006 || Kitt Peak || Spacewatch || — || align=right | 3.5 km || 
|-id=895 bgcolor=#E9E9E9
| 311895 ||  || — || December 17, 2006 || Mount Lemmon || Mount Lemmon Survey || HNA || align=right | 2.1 km || 
|-id=896 bgcolor=#d6d6d6
| 311896 ||  || — || December 20, 2006 || Mount Lemmon || Mount Lemmon Survey || — || align=right | 3.0 km || 
|-id=897 bgcolor=#d6d6d6
| 311897 ||  || — || December 23, 2006 || Mount Lemmon || Mount Lemmon Survey || — || align=right | 4.6 km || 
|-id=898 bgcolor=#d6d6d6
| 311898 ||  || — || December 21, 2006 || Kitt Peak || Spacewatch || KOR || align=right | 1.4 km || 
|-id=899 bgcolor=#d6d6d6
| 311899 ||  || — || December 25, 2006 || Kitt Peak || Spacewatch || — || align=right | 2.7 km || 
|-id=900 bgcolor=#d6d6d6
| 311900 ||  || — || December 21, 2006 || Mount Lemmon || Mount Lemmon Survey || — || align=right | 4.6 km || 
|}

311901–312000 

|-bgcolor=#d6d6d6
| 311901 ||  || — || December 24, 2006 || Kitt Peak || Spacewatch || — || align=right | 3.3 km || 
|-id=902 bgcolor=#d6d6d6
| 311902 ||  || — || December 27, 2006 || Mount Lemmon || Mount Lemmon Survey || — || align=right | 3.2 km || 
|-id=903 bgcolor=#d6d6d6
| 311903 ||  || — || December 24, 2006 || Kitt Peak || Spacewatch || — || align=right | 2.5 km || 
|-id=904 bgcolor=#E9E9E9
| 311904 ||  || — || January 8, 2007 || Catalina || CSS || DOR || align=right | 3.2 km || 
|-id=905 bgcolor=#d6d6d6
| 311905 ||  || — || January 9, 2007 || Mount Lemmon || Mount Lemmon Survey || — || align=right | 4.1 km || 
|-id=906 bgcolor=#d6d6d6
| 311906 ||  || — || January 10, 2007 || Nyukasa || Mount Nyukasa Stn. || — || align=right | 1.9 km || 
|-id=907 bgcolor=#d6d6d6
| 311907 ||  || — || January 12, 2007 || Vallemare di Borbona || V. S. Casulli || — || align=right | 3.6 km || 
|-id=908 bgcolor=#d6d6d6
| 311908 ||  || — || January 9, 2007 || Kitt Peak || Spacewatch || EUP || align=right | 5.8 km || 
|-id=909 bgcolor=#fefefe
| 311909 ||  || — || January 9, 2007 || Kitt Peak || Spacewatch || H || align=right data-sort-value="0.78" | 780 m || 
|-id=910 bgcolor=#d6d6d6
| 311910 ||  || — || January 8, 2007 || Catalina || CSS || — || align=right | 3.8 km || 
|-id=911 bgcolor=#d6d6d6
| 311911 ||  || — || January 10, 2007 || Socorro || LINEAR || — || align=right | 3.2 km || 
|-id=912 bgcolor=#d6d6d6
| 311912 ||  || — || January 16, 2007 || Socorro || LINEAR || — || align=right | 3.4 km || 
|-id=913 bgcolor=#d6d6d6
| 311913 ||  || — || January 17, 2007 || Kitt Peak || Spacewatch || — || align=right | 3.5 km || 
|-id=914 bgcolor=#d6d6d6
| 311914 ||  || — || January 17, 2007 || Kitt Peak || Spacewatch || — || align=right | 5.6 km || 
|-id=915 bgcolor=#d6d6d6
| 311915 ||  || — || January 17, 2007 || Palomar || NEAT || — || align=right | 2.2 km || 
|-id=916 bgcolor=#d6d6d6
| 311916 ||  || — || January 21, 2007 || Socorro || LINEAR || — || align=right | 2.8 km || 
|-id=917 bgcolor=#d6d6d6
| 311917 ||  || — || January 24, 2007 || Socorro || LINEAR || — || align=right | 4.8 km || 
|-id=918 bgcolor=#d6d6d6
| 311918 ||  || — || January 24, 2007 || Catalina || CSS || EOS || align=right | 2.3 km || 
|-id=919 bgcolor=#d6d6d6
| 311919 ||  || — || January 24, 2007 || Mount Lemmon || Mount Lemmon Survey || — || align=right | 3.7 km || 
|-id=920 bgcolor=#d6d6d6
| 311920 ||  || — || January 24, 2007 || Mount Lemmon || Mount Lemmon Survey || EOS || align=right | 2.1 km || 
|-id=921 bgcolor=#d6d6d6
| 311921 ||  || — || January 24, 2007 || Catalina || CSS || URS || align=right | 5.4 km || 
|-id=922 bgcolor=#d6d6d6
| 311922 ||  || — || January 26, 2007 || Kitt Peak || Spacewatch || — || align=right | 3.9 km || 
|-id=923 bgcolor=#d6d6d6
| 311923 ||  || — || January 26, 2007 || Kitt Peak || Spacewatch || — || align=right | 2.3 km || 
|-id=924 bgcolor=#d6d6d6
| 311924 ||  || — || January 24, 2007 || Catalina || CSS || — || align=right | 4.6 km || 
|-id=925 bgcolor=#FFC2E0
| 311925 ||  || — || January 28, 2007 || Kitt Peak || Spacewatch || AMO || align=right data-sort-value="0.39" | 390 m || 
|-id=926 bgcolor=#d6d6d6
| 311926 ||  || — || January 27, 2007 || Farra d'Isonzo || Farra d'Isonzo || EOS || align=right | 2.4 km || 
|-id=927 bgcolor=#d6d6d6
| 311927 ||  || — || January 23, 2007 || Socorro || LINEAR || Tj (2.96) || align=right | 3.9 km || 
|-id=928 bgcolor=#d6d6d6
| 311928 ||  || — || January 28, 2007 || Mount Lemmon || Mount Lemmon Survey || — || align=right | 3.0 km || 
|-id=929 bgcolor=#d6d6d6
| 311929 ||  || — || February 6, 2007 || Kitt Peak || Spacewatch || — || align=right | 3.1 km || 
|-id=930 bgcolor=#d6d6d6
| 311930 ||  || — || January 17, 2007 || Kitt Peak || Spacewatch || — || align=right | 3.5 km || 
|-id=931 bgcolor=#d6d6d6
| 311931 ||  || — || February 6, 2007 || Mount Lemmon || Mount Lemmon Survey || — || align=right | 3.8 km || 
|-id=932 bgcolor=#d6d6d6
| 311932 ||  || — || February 8, 2007 || 7300 || W. K. Y. Yeung || — || align=right | 3.4 km || 
|-id=933 bgcolor=#d6d6d6
| 311933 ||  || — || February 5, 2007 || Lulin Observatory || H.-C. Lin, Q.-z. Ye || — || align=right | 4.3 km || 
|-id=934 bgcolor=#d6d6d6
| 311934 ||  || — || February 6, 2007 || Mount Lemmon || Mount Lemmon Survey || — || align=right | 3.5 km || 
|-id=935 bgcolor=#d6d6d6
| 311935 ||  || — || February 6, 2007 || Mount Lemmon || Mount Lemmon Survey || — || align=right | 3.5 km || 
|-id=936 bgcolor=#d6d6d6
| 311936 ||  || — || February 6, 2007 || Mount Lemmon || Mount Lemmon Survey || — || align=right | 4.1 km || 
|-id=937 bgcolor=#d6d6d6
| 311937 ||  || — || February 6, 2007 || Kitt Peak || Spacewatch || ALA || align=right | 4.8 km || 
|-id=938 bgcolor=#d6d6d6
| 311938 ||  || — || February 6, 2007 || Mount Lemmon || Mount Lemmon Survey || — || align=right | 3.3 km || 
|-id=939 bgcolor=#d6d6d6
| 311939 ||  || — || February 8, 2007 || Palomar || NEAT || — || align=right | 2.7 km || 
|-id=940 bgcolor=#d6d6d6
| 311940 ||  || — || February 8, 2007 || Palomar || NEAT || EOS || align=right | 2.1 km || 
|-id=941 bgcolor=#d6d6d6
| 311941 ||  || — || February 8, 2007 || Mount Lemmon || Mount Lemmon Survey || — || align=right | 3.5 km || 
|-id=942 bgcolor=#d6d6d6
| 311942 ||  || — || February 8, 2007 || Palomar || NEAT || HYG || align=right | 4.1 km || 
|-id=943 bgcolor=#d6d6d6
| 311943 ||  || — || March 19, 1996 || Haleakala || NEAT || — || align=right | 3.9 km || 
|-id=944 bgcolor=#d6d6d6
| 311944 ||  || — || February 9, 2007 || Catalina || CSS || TIR || align=right | 3.6 km || 
|-id=945 bgcolor=#d6d6d6
| 311945 ||  || — || February 10, 2007 || Catalina || CSS || URS || align=right | 5.9 km || 
|-id=946 bgcolor=#fefefe
| 311946 ||  || — || February 15, 2007 || Marly || P. Kocher || H || align=right data-sort-value="0.93" | 930 m || 
|-id=947 bgcolor=#d6d6d6
| 311947 ||  || — || February 10, 2007 || Catalina || CSS || — || align=right | 2.4 km || 
|-id=948 bgcolor=#d6d6d6
| 311948 ||  || — || February 9, 2007 || Kitt Peak || Spacewatch || — || align=right | 2.7 km || 
|-id=949 bgcolor=#d6d6d6
| 311949 ||  || — || February 16, 2007 || Mayhill || A. Lowe || — || align=right | 3.2 km || 
|-id=950 bgcolor=#d6d6d6
| 311950 || 2007 DN || — || February 16, 2007 || Wildberg || R. Apitzsch || — || align=right | 2.9 km || 
|-id=951 bgcolor=#fefefe
| 311951 ||  || — || February 16, 2007 || Catalina || CSS || H || align=right data-sort-value="0.85" | 850 m || 
|-id=952 bgcolor=#d6d6d6
| 311952 ||  || — || February 16, 2007 || Palomar || NEAT || — || align=right | 4.0 km || 
|-id=953 bgcolor=#d6d6d6
| 311953 ||  || — || February 17, 2007 || Kitt Peak || Spacewatch || — || align=right | 2.9 km || 
|-id=954 bgcolor=#d6d6d6
| 311954 ||  || — || February 17, 2007 || Kitt Peak || Spacewatch || — || align=right | 3.0 km || 
|-id=955 bgcolor=#d6d6d6
| 311955 ||  || — || February 17, 2007 || Kitt Peak || Spacewatch || EOS || align=right | 2.6 km || 
|-id=956 bgcolor=#d6d6d6
| 311956 ||  || — || February 17, 2007 || Kitt Peak || Spacewatch || — || align=right | 3.6 km || 
|-id=957 bgcolor=#E9E9E9
| 311957 Barryalbright ||  ||  || February 17, 2007 || Mount Lemmon || Mount Lemmon Survey || — || align=right | 1.9 km || 
|-id=958 bgcolor=#d6d6d6
| 311958 ||  || — || February 21, 2007 || Mount Lemmon || Mount Lemmon Survey || — || align=right | 3.5 km || 
|-id=959 bgcolor=#d6d6d6
| 311959 ||  || — || February 21, 2007 || Kitt Peak || Spacewatch || — || align=right | 2.3 km || 
|-id=960 bgcolor=#d6d6d6
| 311960 ||  || — || February 22, 2007 || Kitt Peak || Spacewatch || — || align=right | 3.9 km || 
|-id=961 bgcolor=#fefefe
| 311961 ||  || — || February 19, 2007 || Catalina || CSS || H || align=right data-sort-value="0.77" | 770 m || 
|-id=962 bgcolor=#d6d6d6
| 311962 ||  || — || February 21, 2007 || Kitt Peak || Spacewatch || THM || align=right | 2.2 km || 
|-id=963 bgcolor=#d6d6d6
| 311963 ||  || — || February 22, 2007 || Anderson Mesa || LONEOS || — || align=right | 2.4 km || 
|-id=964 bgcolor=#d6d6d6
| 311964 ||  || — || February 23, 2007 || Kitt Peak || Spacewatch || — || align=right | 3.4 km || 
|-id=965 bgcolor=#d6d6d6
| 311965 ||  || — || February 23, 2007 || Mount Lemmon || Mount Lemmon Survey || HYG || align=right | 3.2 km || 
|-id=966 bgcolor=#d6d6d6
| 311966 ||  || — || February 23, 2007 || Catalina || CSS || TIR || align=right | 3.3 km || 
|-id=967 bgcolor=#d6d6d6
| 311967 ||  || — || March 1, 2007 || Siding Spring || SSS || — || align=right | 4.2 km || 
|-id=968 bgcolor=#d6d6d6
| 311968 ||  || — || March 9, 2007 || Mount Lemmon || Mount Lemmon Survey || — || align=right | 3.1 km || 
|-id=969 bgcolor=#fefefe
| 311969 ||  || — || March 10, 2007 || Kitt Peak || Spacewatch || H || align=right data-sort-value="0.51" | 510 m || 
|-id=970 bgcolor=#d6d6d6
| 311970 ||  || — || March 11, 2007 || Kitt Peak || Spacewatch || HYG || align=right | 4.6 km || 
|-id=971 bgcolor=#d6d6d6
| 311971 ||  || — || March 11, 2007 || Črni Vrh || Črni Vrh || — || align=right | 5.2 km || 
|-id=972 bgcolor=#d6d6d6
| 311972 ||  || — || March 9, 2007 || Mount Lemmon || Mount Lemmon Survey || — || align=right | 2.1 km || 
|-id=973 bgcolor=#d6d6d6
| 311973 ||  || — || March 11, 2007 || Catalina || CSS || LIX || align=right | 4.6 km || 
|-id=974 bgcolor=#d6d6d6
| 311974 ||  || — || March 14, 2007 || Mayhill || A. Lowe || — || align=right | 5.4 km || 
|-id=975 bgcolor=#d6d6d6
| 311975 ||  || — || March 9, 2007 || Mount Lemmon || Mount Lemmon Survey || — || align=right | 2.6 km || 
|-id=976 bgcolor=#d6d6d6
| 311976 ||  || — || March 9, 2007 || Mount Lemmon || Mount Lemmon Survey || HYG || align=right | 4.2 km || 
|-id=977 bgcolor=#d6d6d6
| 311977 ||  || — || March 12, 2007 || Kitt Peak || Spacewatch || — || align=right | 3.6 km || 
|-id=978 bgcolor=#d6d6d6
| 311978 ||  || — || March 12, 2007 || Catalina || CSS || EOS || align=right | 3.0 km || 
|-id=979 bgcolor=#d6d6d6
| 311979 ||  || — || March 10, 2007 || Kitt Peak || Spacewatch || HYG || align=right | 2.9 km || 
|-id=980 bgcolor=#d6d6d6
| 311980 ||  || — || March 14, 2007 || Catalina || CSS || — || align=right | 5.6 km || 
|-id=981 bgcolor=#d6d6d6
| 311981 ||  || — || March 10, 2007 || Kitt Peak || Spacewatch || — || align=right | 4.1 km || 
|-id=982 bgcolor=#d6d6d6
| 311982 ||  || — || March 15, 2007 || Catalina || CSS || EOS || align=right | 3.2 km || 
|-id=983 bgcolor=#d6d6d6
| 311983 ||  || — || March 10, 2007 || Siding Spring || SSS || — || align=right | 6.1 km || 
|-id=984 bgcolor=#d6d6d6
| 311984 ||  || — || March 8, 2007 || Palomar || NEAT || HYG || align=right | 3.7 km || 
|-id=985 bgcolor=#d6d6d6
| 311985 ||  || — || March 11, 2007 || Catalina || CSS || — || align=right | 5.3 km || 
|-id=986 bgcolor=#d6d6d6
| 311986 ||  || — || March 20, 2007 || Mount Lemmon || Mount Lemmon Survey || — || align=right | 2.9 km || 
|-id=987 bgcolor=#FA8072
| 311987 ||  || — || March 29, 2007 || Palomar || NEAT || H || align=right data-sort-value="0.96" | 960 m || 
|-id=988 bgcolor=#d6d6d6
| 311988 ||  || — || April 10, 2007 || Purple Mountain || PMO NEO || EUP || align=right | 9.1 km || 
|-id=989 bgcolor=#d6d6d6
| 311989 ||  || — || April 11, 2007 || Mount Lemmon || Mount Lemmon Survey || — || align=right | 3.7 km || 
|-id=990 bgcolor=#d6d6d6
| 311990 ||  || — || April 11, 2007 || Catalina || CSS || — || align=right | 6.6 km || 
|-id=991 bgcolor=#fefefe
| 311991 ||  || — || April 20, 2007 || Sandlot || G. Hug || H || align=right data-sort-value="0.73" | 730 m || 
|-id=992 bgcolor=#d6d6d6
| 311992 ||  || — || April 11, 2007 || Kitt Peak || Spacewatch || — || align=right | 4.0 km || 
|-id=993 bgcolor=#fefefe
| 311993 ||  || — || May 20, 2007 || Catalina || CSS || H || align=right data-sort-value="0.84" | 840 m || 
|-id=994 bgcolor=#d6d6d6
| 311994 ||  || — || May 20, 2007 || Siding Spring || SSS || — || align=right | 7.3 km || 
|-id=995 bgcolor=#d6d6d6
| 311995 ||  || — || June 7, 2007 || Kitt Peak || Spacewatch || — || align=right | 3.7 km || 
|-id=996 bgcolor=#fefefe
| 311996 ||  || — || June 9, 2007 || Catalina || CSS || H || align=right data-sort-value="0.93" | 930 m || 
|-id=997 bgcolor=#C2FFFF
| 311997 ||  || — || June 16, 2007 || Kitt Peak || Spacewatch || L4 || align=right | 11 km || 
|-id=998 bgcolor=#fefefe
| 311998 ||  || — || June 17, 2007 || Kitt Peak || Spacewatch || — || align=right | 1.2 km || 
|-id=999 bgcolor=#FA8072
| 311999 ||  || — || July 14, 2007 || La Sagra || OAM Obs. || — || align=right data-sort-value="0.71" | 710 m || 
|-id=000 bgcolor=#fefefe
| 312000 ||  || — || July 21, 2007 || Antares || ARO || — || align=right data-sort-value="0.85" | 850 m || 
|}

References

External links 
 Discovery Circumstances: Numbered Minor Planets (310001)–(315000) (IAU Minor Planet Center)

0311